

432001–432100 

|-bgcolor=#E9E9E9
| 432001 ||  || — || October 31, 2008 || Mount Lemmon || Mount Lemmon Survey || — || align=right | 2.2 km || 
|-id=002 bgcolor=#E9E9E9
| 432002 ||  || — || October 23, 2008 || Kitt Peak || Spacewatch || — || align=right | 1.2 km || 
|-id=003 bgcolor=#fefefe
| 432003 ||  || — || October 31, 2008 || Mount Lemmon || Mount Lemmon Survey || H || align=right data-sort-value="0.60" | 600 m || 
|-id=004 bgcolor=#d6d6d6
| 432004 ||  || — || October 23, 2008 || Kitt Peak || Spacewatch || EOS || align=right | 2.3 km || 
|-id=005 bgcolor=#E9E9E9
| 432005 ||  || — || October 27, 2008 || Mount Lemmon || Mount Lemmon Survey || — || align=right | 1.4 km || 
|-id=006 bgcolor=#E9E9E9
| 432006 ||  || — || October 30, 2008 || Kitt Peak || Spacewatch || AST || align=right | 1.6 km || 
|-id=007 bgcolor=#E9E9E9
| 432007 ||  || — || October 31, 2008 || Mount Lemmon || Mount Lemmon Survey || — || align=right | 2.7 km || 
|-id=008 bgcolor=#E9E9E9
| 432008 ||  || — || October 24, 2008 || Kitt Peak || Spacewatch || NEM || align=right | 2.2 km || 
|-id=009 bgcolor=#d6d6d6
| 432009 ||  || — || October 24, 2008 || Mount Lemmon || Mount Lemmon Survey || — || align=right | 2.9 km || 
|-id=010 bgcolor=#E9E9E9
| 432010 ||  || — || October 23, 2008 || Kitt Peak || Spacewatch || — || align=right | 1.4 km || 
|-id=011 bgcolor=#E9E9E9
| 432011 ||  || — || October 24, 2008 || Catalina || CSS || — || align=right | 2.2 km || 
|-id=012 bgcolor=#E9E9E9
| 432012 ||  || — || October 7, 2008 || Mount Lemmon || Mount Lemmon Survey || EUN || align=right | 1.5 km || 
|-id=013 bgcolor=#E9E9E9
| 432013 ||  || — || October 20, 2008 || Kitt Peak || Spacewatch ||  || align=right | 2.0 km || 
|-id=014 bgcolor=#E9E9E9
| 432014 ||  || — || October 22, 2008 || Kitt Peak || Spacewatch || — || align=right | 2.3 km || 
|-id=015 bgcolor=#E9E9E9
| 432015 ||  || — || November 1, 2008 || Kitt Peak || Spacewatch || — || align=right | 2.5 km || 
|-id=016 bgcolor=#E9E9E9
| 432016 ||  || — || September 6, 2008 || Catalina || CSS || — || align=right | 2.0 km || 
|-id=017 bgcolor=#E9E9E9
| 432017 ||  || — || November 2, 2008 || Kitt Peak || Spacewatch || — || align=right | 2.0 km || 
|-id=018 bgcolor=#d6d6d6
| 432018 ||  || — || November 1, 2008 || Kitt Peak || Spacewatch || — || align=right | 2.8 km || 
|-id=019 bgcolor=#E9E9E9
| 432019 ||  || — || November 2, 2008 || Mount Lemmon || Mount Lemmon Survey || — || align=right | 2.4 km || 
|-id=020 bgcolor=#E9E9E9
| 432020 ||  || — || November 2, 2008 || Mount Lemmon || Mount Lemmon Survey || AGN || align=right | 1.2 km || 
|-id=021 bgcolor=#d6d6d6
| 432021 ||  || — || October 26, 2008 || Kitt Peak || Spacewatch || — || align=right | 2.9 km || 
|-id=022 bgcolor=#E9E9E9
| 432022 ||  || — || November 4, 2008 || Kitt Peak || Spacewatch || — || align=right | 2.1 km || 
|-id=023 bgcolor=#E9E9E9
| 432023 ||  || — || September 29, 2008 || Kitt Peak || Spacewatch || NEM || align=right | 2.1 km || 
|-id=024 bgcolor=#E9E9E9
| 432024 ||  || — || November 1, 2008 || Mount Lemmon || Mount Lemmon Survey || — || align=right | 1.9 km || 
|-id=025 bgcolor=#E9E9E9
| 432025 ||  || — || November 17, 2008 || Kitt Peak || Spacewatch || ADE || align=right | 2.6 km || 
|-id=026 bgcolor=#E9E9E9
| 432026 ||  || — || October 23, 2008 || Mount Lemmon || Mount Lemmon Survey || — || align=right | 1.8 km || 
|-id=027 bgcolor=#E9E9E9
| 432027 ||  || — || October 21, 2008 || Kitt Peak || Spacewatch || — || align=right | 2.0 km || 
|-id=028 bgcolor=#d6d6d6
| 432028 ||  || — || November 17, 2008 || Kitt Peak || Spacewatch || — || align=right | 2.1 km || 
|-id=029 bgcolor=#d6d6d6
| 432029 ||  || — || November 17, 2008 || Kitt Peak || Spacewatch || — || align=right | 1.9 km || 
|-id=030 bgcolor=#d6d6d6
| 432030 ||  || — || October 24, 2008 || Kitt Peak || Spacewatch || KOR || align=right | 1.3 km || 
|-id=031 bgcolor=#d6d6d6
| 432031 ||  || — || September 28, 2008 || Mount Lemmon || Mount Lemmon Survey || KOR || align=right | 1.3 km || 
|-id=032 bgcolor=#d6d6d6
| 432032 ||  || — || November 17, 2008 || Kitt Peak || Spacewatch || — || align=right | 2.8 km || 
|-id=033 bgcolor=#E9E9E9
| 432033 ||  || — || November 18, 2008 || Catalina || CSS || — || align=right | 2.4 km || 
|-id=034 bgcolor=#E9E9E9
| 432034 ||  || — || September 24, 2008 || Kitt Peak || Spacewatch || — || align=right | 2.3 km || 
|-id=035 bgcolor=#d6d6d6
| 432035 ||  || — || November 18, 2008 || Socorro || LINEAR || — || align=right | 3.0 km || 
|-id=036 bgcolor=#FA8072
| 432036 ||  || — || October 29, 2008 || Kitt Peak || Spacewatch || — || align=right | 1.6 km || 
|-id=037 bgcolor=#FA8072
| 432037 ||  || — || September 29, 2008 || Socorro || LINEAR || — || align=right | 3.1 km || 
|-id=038 bgcolor=#d6d6d6
| 432038 ||  || — || November 19, 2008 || Kitt Peak || Spacewatch || KOR || align=right | 1.1 km || 
|-id=039 bgcolor=#d6d6d6
| 432039 ||  || — || November 20, 2008 || Kitt Peak || Spacewatch || — || align=right | 2.2 km || 
|-id=040 bgcolor=#d6d6d6
| 432040 ||  || — || November 20, 2008 || Kitt Peak || Spacewatch || BRA || align=right | 1.7 km || 
|-id=041 bgcolor=#FA8072
| 432041 ||  || — || November 24, 2008 || Kitt Peak || Spacewatch || H || align=right data-sort-value="0.73" | 730 m || 
|-id=042 bgcolor=#E9E9E9
| 432042 ||  || — || November 27, 2008 || La Sagra || OAM Obs. || — || align=right | 3.3 km || 
|-id=043 bgcolor=#E9E9E9
| 432043 ||  || — || November 30, 2008 || Kitt Peak || Spacewatch || HOF || align=right | 2.2 km || 
|-id=044 bgcolor=#d6d6d6
| 432044 ||  || — || November 30, 2008 || Kitt Peak || Spacewatch || — || align=right | 2.0 km || 
|-id=045 bgcolor=#d6d6d6
| 432045 ||  || — || November 30, 2008 || Kitt Peak || Spacewatch || — || align=right | 2.2 km || 
|-id=046 bgcolor=#d6d6d6
| 432046 ||  || — || November 30, 2008 || Mount Lemmon || Mount Lemmon Survey || — || align=right | 2.2 km || 
|-id=047 bgcolor=#d6d6d6
| 432047 ||  || — || November 24, 2008 || Socorro || LINEAR || — || align=right | 4.9 km || 
|-id=048 bgcolor=#d6d6d6
| 432048 ||  || — || November 23, 2008 || Kitt Peak || Spacewatch || — || align=right | 3.4 km || 
|-id=049 bgcolor=#d6d6d6
| 432049 ||  || — || November 19, 2008 || Kitt Peak || Spacewatch || — || align=right | 2.5 km || 
|-id=050 bgcolor=#d6d6d6
| 432050 ||  || — || December 2, 2008 || Kitt Peak || Spacewatch || KOR || align=right | 1.3 km || 
|-id=051 bgcolor=#d6d6d6
| 432051 ||  || — || December 7, 2008 || Mount Lemmon || Mount Lemmon Survey || — || align=right | 3.4 km || 
|-id=052 bgcolor=#d6d6d6
| 432052 ||  || — || December 3, 2008 || Mount Lemmon || Mount Lemmon Survey || — || align=right | 4.1 km || 
|-id=053 bgcolor=#d6d6d6
| 432053 ||  || — || November 22, 2008 || Mount Lemmon || Mount Lemmon Survey || — || align=right | 2.8 km || 
|-id=054 bgcolor=#d6d6d6
| 432054 ||  || — || December 21, 2008 || Mount Lemmon || Mount Lemmon Survey || — || align=right | 3.6 km || 
|-id=055 bgcolor=#d6d6d6
| 432055 ||  || — || December 21, 2008 || Mount Lemmon || Mount Lemmon Survey || THM || align=right | 2.0 km || 
|-id=056 bgcolor=#d6d6d6
| 432056 ||  || — || December 21, 2008 || Mount Lemmon || Mount Lemmon Survey || — || align=right | 2.6 km || 
|-id=057 bgcolor=#d6d6d6
| 432057 ||  || — || December 21, 2008 || Mount Lemmon || Mount Lemmon Survey || — || align=right | 3.4 km || 
|-id=058 bgcolor=#d6d6d6
| 432058 ||  || — || December 21, 2008 || Mount Lemmon || Mount Lemmon Survey || — || align=right | 4.8 km || 
|-id=059 bgcolor=#d6d6d6
| 432059 ||  || — || December 21, 2008 || Kitt Peak || Spacewatch || — || align=right | 2.6 km || 
|-id=060 bgcolor=#fefefe
| 432060 ||  || — || December 31, 2008 || Calvin-Rehoboth || L. A. Molnar || H || align=right data-sort-value="0.71" | 710 m || 
|-id=061 bgcolor=#d6d6d6
| 432061 ||  || — || November 18, 2008 || Kitt Peak || Spacewatch || — || align=right | 2.3 km || 
|-id=062 bgcolor=#d6d6d6
| 432062 ||  || — || December 29, 2008 || Mount Lemmon || Mount Lemmon Survey || — || align=right | 2.5 km || 
|-id=063 bgcolor=#d6d6d6
| 432063 ||  || — || December 30, 2008 || Mount Lemmon || Mount Lemmon Survey || — || align=right | 2.6 km || 
|-id=064 bgcolor=#d6d6d6
| 432064 ||  || — || December 29, 2008 || Mount Lemmon || Mount Lemmon Survey || — || align=right | 4.1 km || 
|-id=065 bgcolor=#d6d6d6
| 432065 ||  || — || December 29, 2008 || Mount Lemmon || Mount Lemmon Survey || — || align=right | 2.8 km || 
|-id=066 bgcolor=#d6d6d6
| 432066 ||  || — || November 30, 2008 || Mount Lemmon || Mount Lemmon Survey || — || align=right | 3.0 km || 
|-id=067 bgcolor=#d6d6d6
| 432067 ||  || — || December 29, 2008 || Kitt Peak || Spacewatch || — || align=right | 3.6 km || 
|-id=068 bgcolor=#d6d6d6
| 432068 ||  || — || December 29, 2008 || Kitt Peak || Spacewatch || THM || align=right | 2.0 km || 
|-id=069 bgcolor=#d6d6d6
| 432069 ||  || — || December 29, 2008 || Mount Lemmon || Mount Lemmon Survey || — || align=right | 3.1 km || 
|-id=070 bgcolor=#d6d6d6
| 432070 ||  || — || December 21, 2008 || Mount Lemmon || Mount Lemmon Survey || VER || align=right | 2.6 km || 
|-id=071 bgcolor=#d6d6d6
| 432071 ||  || — || December 29, 2008 || Kitt Peak || Spacewatch || — || align=right | 2.3 km || 
|-id=072 bgcolor=#d6d6d6
| 432072 ||  || — || December 29, 2008 || Kitt Peak || Spacewatch || — || align=right | 3.0 km || 
|-id=073 bgcolor=#d6d6d6
| 432073 ||  || — || November 23, 2008 || Mount Lemmon || Mount Lemmon Survey || — || align=right | 2.8 km || 
|-id=074 bgcolor=#d6d6d6
| 432074 ||  || — || December 31, 2008 || Kitt Peak || Spacewatch || — || align=right | 1.9 km || 
|-id=075 bgcolor=#d6d6d6
| 432075 ||  || — || December 30, 2008 || Kitt Peak || Spacewatch || — || align=right | 4.4 km || 
|-id=076 bgcolor=#d6d6d6
| 432076 ||  || — || December 4, 2008 || Mount Lemmon || Mount Lemmon Survey || — || align=right | 2.2 km || 
|-id=077 bgcolor=#d6d6d6
| 432077 ||  || — || December 30, 2008 || Kitt Peak || Spacewatch || — || align=right | 3.2 km || 
|-id=078 bgcolor=#d6d6d6
| 432078 ||  || — || December 30, 2008 || Kitt Peak || Spacewatch || THM || align=right | 2.0 km || 
|-id=079 bgcolor=#fefefe
| 432079 ||  || — || December 30, 2008 || Kitt Peak || Spacewatch || — || align=right | 1.6 km || 
|-id=080 bgcolor=#d6d6d6
| 432080 ||  || — || December 7, 2008 || Mount Lemmon || Mount Lemmon Survey || — || align=right | 3.3 km || 
|-id=081 bgcolor=#d6d6d6
| 432081 ||  || — || December 30, 2008 || Mount Lemmon || Mount Lemmon Survey || EOS || align=right | 1.6 km || 
|-id=082 bgcolor=#d6d6d6
| 432082 ||  || — || December 22, 2008 || Kitt Peak || Spacewatch || — || align=right | 3.1 km || 
|-id=083 bgcolor=#d6d6d6
| 432083 ||  || — || December 30, 2008 || Kitt Peak || Spacewatch || — || align=right | 2.2 km || 
|-id=084 bgcolor=#d6d6d6
| 432084 ||  || — || November 21, 2008 || Mount Lemmon || Mount Lemmon Survey || — || align=right | 2.3 km || 
|-id=085 bgcolor=#d6d6d6
| 432085 ||  || — || September 12, 2007 || Mount Lemmon || Mount Lemmon Survey || THM || align=right | 2.1 km || 
|-id=086 bgcolor=#d6d6d6
| 432086 ||  || — || December 22, 2008 || Mount Lemmon || Mount Lemmon Survey || — || align=right | 4.5 km || 
|-id=087 bgcolor=#d6d6d6
| 432087 ||  || — || December 22, 2008 || Mount Lemmon || Mount Lemmon Survey || LIX || align=right | 3.7 km || 
|-id=088 bgcolor=#d6d6d6
| 432088 ||  || — || December 30, 2008 || Kitt Peak || Spacewatch || — || align=right | 2.6 km || 
|-id=089 bgcolor=#d6d6d6
| 432089 ||  || — || December 22, 2008 || Mount Lemmon || Mount Lemmon Survey || — || align=right | 4.3 km || 
|-id=090 bgcolor=#d6d6d6
| 432090 ||  || — || December 22, 2008 || Kitt Peak || Spacewatch || EOS || align=right | 1.6 km || 
|-id=091 bgcolor=#d6d6d6
| 432091 ||  || — || December 22, 2008 || Kitt Peak || Spacewatch || EOS || align=right | 1.6 km || 
|-id=092 bgcolor=#d6d6d6
| 432092 ||  || — || December 30, 2008 || Catalina || CSS || — || align=right | 3.5 km || 
|-id=093 bgcolor=#d6d6d6
| 432093 ||  || — || December 30, 2008 || Mount Lemmon || Mount Lemmon Survey || — || align=right | 2.7 km || 
|-id=094 bgcolor=#d6d6d6
| 432094 ||  || — || December 31, 2008 || Mount Lemmon || Mount Lemmon Survey || — || align=right | 3.4 km || 
|-id=095 bgcolor=#d6d6d6
| 432095 ||  || — || December 22, 2008 || Kitt Peak || Spacewatch || — || align=right | 3.5 km || 
|-id=096 bgcolor=#d6d6d6
| 432096 ||  || — || December 31, 2008 || Catalina || CSS || — || align=right | 2.8 km || 
|-id=097 bgcolor=#d6d6d6
| 432097 ||  || — || December 22, 2008 || Kitt Peak || Spacewatch || — || align=right | 2.2 km || 
|-id=098 bgcolor=#d6d6d6
| 432098 ||  || — || December 22, 2008 || Kitt Peak || Spacewatch || — || align=right | 2.1 km || 
|-id=099 bgcolor=#d6d6d6
| 432099 ||  || — || January 2, 2009 || Mount Lemmon || Mount Lemmon Survey || — || align=right | 2.5 km || 
|-id=100 bgcolor=#d6d6d6
| 432100 ||  || — || January 3, 2009 || Kitt Peak || Spacewatch || — || align=right | 2.2 km || 
|}

432101–432200 

|-bgcolor=#d6d6d6
| 432101 Ngari ||  ||  || January 14, 2009 || Lulin Observatory || Q.-z. Ye, H.-C. Lin || — || align=right | 3.6 km || 
|-id=102 bgcolor=#d6d6d6
| 432102 ||  || — || January 15, 2009 || Kitt Peak || Spacewatch || — || align=right | 2.3 km || 
|-id=103 bgcolor=#d6d6d6
| 432103 ||  || — || January 15, 2009 || Kitt Peak || Spacewatch || — || align=right | 2.9 km || 
|-id=104 bgcolor=#d6d6d6
| 432104 ||  || — || January 15, 2009 || Kitt Peak || Spacewatch || — || align=right | 3.4 km || 
|-id=105 bgcolor=#d6d6d6
| 432105 ||  || — || January 15, 2009 || Kitt Peak || Spacewatch || — || align=right | 3.2 km || 
|-id=106 bgcolor=#d6d6d6
| 432106 ||  || — || November 24, 2008 || Mount Lemmon || Mount Lemmon Survey || VER || align=right | 2.7 km || 
|-id=107 bgcolor=#d6d6d6
| 432107 ||  || — || January 15, 2009 || Kitt Peak || Spacewatch || — || align=right | 2.9 km || 
|-id=108 bgcolor=#E9E9E9
| 432108 ||  || — || January 8, 2009 || Kitt Peak || Spacewatch || — || align=right | 2.3 km || 
|-id=109 bgcolor=#d6d6d6
| 432109 ||  || — || January 2, 2009 || Catalina || CSS || — || align=right | 2.6 km || 
|-id=110 bgcolor=#d6d6d6
| 432110 ||  || — || January 18, 2009 || Socorro || LINEAR || — || align=right | 3.7 km || 
|-id=111 bgcolor=#d6d6d6
| 432111 ||  || — || January 18, 2009 || Catalina || CSS || — || align=right | 3.1 km || 
|-id=112 bgcolor=#d6d6d6
| 432112 ||  || — || January 17, 2009 || Dauban || F. Kugel || EOS || align=right | 1.7 km || 
|-id=113 bgcolor=#d6d6d6
| 432113 ||  || — || January 25, 2009 || Mayhill || A. Lowe || LIX || align=right | 4.1 km || 
|-id=114 bgcolor=#d6d6d6
| 432114 ||  || — || January 20, 2009 || Socorro || LINEAR || — || align=right | 2.9 km || 
|-id=115 bgcolor=#d6d6d6
| 432115 ||  || — || December 21, 2008 || Kitt Peak || Spacewatch || — || align=right | 2.6 km || 
|-id=116 bgcolor=#d6d6d6
| 432116 ||  || — || January 16, 2009 || Mount Lemmon || Mount Lemmon Survey || — || align=right | 2.1 km || 
|-id=117 bgcolor=#d6d6d6
| 432117 ||  || — || January 16, 2009 || Mount Lemmon || Mount Lemmon Survey || — || align=right | 2.0 km || 
|-id=118 bgcolor=#d6d6d6
| 432118 ||  || — || January 17, 2009 || Kitt Peak || Spacewatch || — || align=right | 2.3 km || 
|-id=119 bgcolor=#d6d6d6
| 432119 ||  || — || January 17, 2009 || Kitt Peak || Spacewatch || EOS || align=right | 1.9 km || 
|-id=120 bgcolor=#d6d6d6
| 432120 ||  || — || January 16, 2009 || Kitt Peak || Spacewatch || — || align=right | 3.1 km || 
|-id=121 bgcolor=#d6d6d6
| 432121 ||  || — || January 2, 2009 || Mount Lemmon || Mount Lemmon Survey || — || align=right | 3.2 km || 
|-id=122 bgcolor=#d6d6d6
| 432122 ||  || — || January 2, 2009 || Kitt Peak || Spacewatch || — || align=right | 2.3 km || 
|-id=123 bgcolor=#d6d6d6
| 432123 ||  || — || January 16, 2009 || Kitt Peak || Spacewatch || — || align=right | 2.6 km || 
|-id=124 bgcolor=#d6d6d6
| 432124 ||  || — || January 16, 2009 || Kitt Peak || Spacewatch || — || align=right | 2.8 km || 
|-id=125 bgcolor=#d6d6d6
| 432125 ||  || — || January 16, 2009 || Kitt Peak || Spacewatch || — || align=right | 2.6 km || 
|-id=126 bgcolor=#d6d6d6
| 432126 ||  || — || January 16, 2009 || Kitt Peak || Spacewatch || — || align=right | 3.4 km || 
|-id=127 bgcolor=#d6d6d6
| 432127 ||  || — || November 23, 2008 || Mount Lemmon || Mount Lemmon Survey || — || align=right | 3.8 km || 
|-id=128 bgcolor=#d6d6d6
| 432128 ||  || — || January 16, 2009 || Kitt Peak || Spacewatch || — || align=right | 2.4 km || 
|-id=129 bgcolor=#d6d6d6
| 432129 ||  || — || January 16, 2009 || Mount Lemmon || Mount Lemmon Survey || — || align=right | 2.3 km || 
|-id=130 bgcolor=#d6d6d6
| 432130 ||  || — || January 16, 2009 || Mount Lemmon || Mount Lemmon Survey || THM || align=right | 1.8 km || 
|-id=131 bgcolor=#d6d6d6
| 432131 ||  || — || January 16, 2009 || Mount Lemmon || Mount Lemmon Survey || — || align=right | 3.1 km || 
|-id=132 bgcolor=#d6d6d6
| 432132 ||  || — || January 16, 2009 || Mount Lemmon || Mount Lemmon Survey || — || align=right | 2.3 km || 
|-id=133 bgcolor=#d6d6d6
| 432133 ||  || — || January 17, 2009 || Mount Lemmon || Mount Lemmon Survey || THM || align=right | 1.6 km || 
|-id=134 bgcolor=#d6d6d6
| 432134 ||  || — || January 18, 2009 || Mount Lemmon || Mount Lemmon Survey || HYG || align=right | 2.1 km || 
|-id=135 bgcolor=#d6d6d6
| 432135 ||  || — || January 20, 2009 || Catalina || CSS || — || align=right | 2.6 km || 
|-id=136 bgcolor=#d6d6d6
| 432136 ||  || — || January 25, 2009 || Catalina || CSS || — || align=right | 2.9 km || 
|-id=137 bgcolor=#d6d6d6
| 432137 ||  || — || January 25, 2009 || Socorro || LINEAR || — || align=right | 3.4 km || 
|-id=138 bgcolor=#d6d6d6
| 432138 ||  || — || January 20, 2009 || Catalina || CSS || — || align=right | 3.1 km || 
|-id=139 bgcolor=#d6d6d6
| 432139 ||  || — || October 24, 2008 || Mount Lemmon || Mount Lemmon Survey || — || align=right | 2.9 km || 
|-id=140 bgcolor=#d6d6d6
| 432140 ||  || — || January 25, 2009 || Kitt Peak || Spacewatch || — || align=right | 2.3 km || 
|-id=141 bgcolor=#d6d6d6
| 432141 ||  || — || December 30, 2008 || Mount Lemmon || Mount Lemmon Survey || — || align=right | 1.9 km || 
|-id=142 bgcolor=#d6d6d6
| 432142 ||  || — || January 25, 2009 || Kitt Peak || Spacewatch || THM || align=right | 2.2 km || 
|-id=143 bgcolor=#d6d6d6
| 432143 ||  || — || January 15, 2009 || Kitt Peak || Spacewatch || — || align=right | 2.3 km || 
|-id=144 bgcolor=#d6d6d6
| 432144 ||  || — || January 25, 2009 || Kitt Peak || Spacewatch || — || align=right | 3.1 km || 
|-id=145 bgcolor=#d6d6d6
| 432145 ||  || — || January 26, 2009 || Mount Lemmon || Mount Lemmon Survey || — || align=right | 2.6 km || 
|-id=146 bgcolor=#d6d6d6
| 432146 ||  || — || December 22, 2008 || Kitt Peak || Spacewatch || EOS || align=right | 1.7 km || 
|-id=147 bgcolor=#d6d6d6
| 432147 ||  || — || January 17, 2009 || Kitt Peak || Spacewatch || — || align=right | 3.2 km || 
|-id=148 bgcolor=#d6d6d6
| 432148 ||  || — || January 16, 2009 || Kitt Peak || Spacewatch || — || align=right | 2.9 km || 
|-id=149 bgcolor=#d6d6d6
| 432149 ||  || — || January 25, 2009 || Kitt Peak || Spacewatch || — || align=right | 2.8 km || 
|-id=150 bgcolor=#d6d6d6
| 432150 ||  || — || January 30, 2009 || Mount Lemmon || Mount Lemmon Survey || EOS || align=right | 1.6 km || 
|-id=151 bgcolor=#d6d6d6
| 432151 ||  || — || January 29, 2009 || Kitt Peak || Spacewatch || — || align=right | 2.5 km || 
|-id=152 bgcolor=#d6d6d6
| 432152 ||  || — || January 16, 2009 || Kitt Peak || Spacewatch || — || align=right | 3.0 km || 
|-id=153 bgcolor=#d6d6d6
| 432153 ||  || — || January 29, 2009 || Kitt Peak || Spacewatch || — || align=right | 2.3 km || 
|-id=154 bgcolor=#d6d6d6
| 432154 ||  || — || January 30, 2009 || Kitt Peak || Spacewatch || (3460) || align=right | 1.8 km || 
|-id=155 bgcolor=#d6d6d6
| 432155 ||  || — || January 30, 2009 || Kitt Peak || Spacewatch || — || align=right | 2.4 km || 
|-id=156 bgcolor=#d6d6d6
| 432156 ||  || — || January 30, 2009 || Kitt Peak || Spacewatch || — || align=right | 4.3 km || 
|-id=157 bgcolor=#d6d6d6
| 432157 ||  || — || January 16, 2009 || Kitt Peak || Spacewatch || EOS || align=right | 1.9 km || 
|-id=158 bgcolor=#d6d6d6
| 432158 ||  || — || November 23, 2008 || Mount Lemmon || Mount Lemmon Survey || — || align=right | 4.0 km || 
|-id=159 bgcolor=#d6d6d6
| 432159 ||  || — || January 30, 2009 || Mount Lemmon || Mount Lemmon Survey || — || align=right | 2.6 km || 
|-id=160 bgcolor=#d6d6d6
| 432160 ||  || — || January 31, 2009 || Kitt Peak || Spacewatch || THM || align=right | 2.0 km || 
|-id=161 bgcolor=#d6d6d6
| 432161 ||  || — || January 31, 2009 || Kitt Peak || Spacewatch || — || align=right | 2.7 km || 
|-id=162 bgcolor=#d6d6d6
| 432162 ||  || — || January 31, 2009 || Kitt Peak || Spacewatch || — || align=right | 3.2 km || 
|-id=163 bgcolor=#d6d6d6
| 432163 ||  || — || December 22, 2008 || Kitt Peak || Spacewatch || — || align=right | 2.9 km || 
|-id=164 bgcolor=#d6d6d6
| 432164 ||  || — || January 16, 2009 || Kitt Peak || Spacewatch || — || align=right | 3.8 km || 
|-id=165 bgcolor=#d6d6d6
| 432165 ||  || — || January 17, 2009 || Kitt Peak || Spacewatch || THM || align=right | 1.9 km || 
|-id=166 bgcolor=#d6d6d6
| 432166 ||  || — || January 18, 2009 || Kitt Peak || Spacewatch || — || align=right | 4.1 km || 
|-id=167 bgcolor=#d6d6d6
| 432167 ||  || — || January 25, 2009 || Kitt Peak || Spacewatch || — || align=right | 2.7 km || 
|-id=168 bgcolor=#d6d6d6
| 432168 ||  || — || January 18, 2009 || Mount Lemmon || Mount Lemmon Survey || — || align=right | 2.5 km || 
|-id=169 bgcolor=#d6d6d6
| 432169 ||  || — || January 29, 2009 || Kitt Peak || Spacewatch || — || align=right | 2.5 km || 
|-id=170 bgcolor=#d6d6d6
| 432170 ||  || — || January 17, 2009 || Mount Lemmon || Mount Lemmon Survey || (8737) || align=right | 3.2 km || 
|-id=171 bgcolor=#d6d6d6
| 432171 ||  || — || January 16, 2009 || Kitt Peak || Spacewatch || — || align=right | 2.7 km || 
|-id=172 bgcolor=#d6d6d6
| 432172 ||  || — || December 22, 2008 || Kitt Peak || Spacewatch || EOS || align=right | 2.1 km || 
|-id=173 bgcolor=#d6d6d6
| 432173 ||  || — || February 1, 2009 || Kitt Peak || Spacewatch || — || align=right | 2.7 km || 
|-id=174 bgcolor=#d6d6d6
| 432174 ||  || — || January 20, 2009 || Mount Lemmon || Mount Lemmon Survey || — || align=right | 3.2 km || 
|-id=175 bgcolor=#d6d6d6
| 432175 ||  || — || February 1, 2009 || Kitt Peak || Spacewatch || — || align=right | 3.1 km || 
|-id=176 bgcolor=#d6d6d6
| 432176 ||  || — || February 2, 2009 || Mount Lemmon || Mount Lemmon Survey || LIX || align=right | 3.8 km || 
|-id=177 bgcolor=#fefefe
| 432177 ||  || — || February 2, 2009 || Mount Lemmon || Mount Lemmon Survey || — || align=right data-sort-value="0.48" | 480 m || 
|-id=178 bgcolor=#d6d6d6
| 432178 ||  || — || February 2, 2009 || Mount Lemmon || Mount Lemmon Survey || — || align=right | 2.8 km || 
|-id=179 bgcolor=#d6d6d6
| 432179 ||  || — || January 15, 2009 || Kitt Peak || Spacewatch || — || align=right | 2.4 km || 
|-id=180 bgcolor=#d6d6d6
| 432180 ||  || — || December 31, 2008 || Mount Lemmon || Mount Lemmon Survey || — || align=right | 2.9 km || 
|-id=181 bgcolor=#d6d6d6
| 432181 ||  || — || February 14, 2009 || Mount Lemmon || Mount Lemmon Survey || — || align=right | 2.8 km || 
|-id=182 bgcolor=#d6d6d6
| 432182 ||  || — || January 16, 2009 || Kitt Peak || Spacewatch || — || align=right | 2.6 km || 
|-id=183 bgcolor=#d6d6d6
| 432183 ||  || — || February 2, 2009 || Kitt Peak || Spacewatch || EOS || align=right | 2.2 km || 
|-id=184 bgcolor=#d6d6d6
| 432184 ||  || — || January 31, 2009 || Mount Lemmon || Mount Lemmon Survey || — || align=right | 2.9 km || 
|-id=185 bgcolor=#d6d6d6
| 432185 ||  || — || February 18, 2009 || Mayhill || A. Lowe || — || align=right | 3.0 km || 
|-id=186 bgcolor=#d6d6d6
| 432186 ||  || — || February 20, 2009 || Pla D'Arguines || R. Ferrando || — || align=right | 3.1 km || 
|-id=187 bgcolor=#d6d6d6
| 432187 ||  || — || February 17, 2009 || Kitt Peak || Spacewatch || — || align=right | 2.0 km || 
|-id=188 bgcolor=#d6d6d6
| 432188 ||  || — || February 17, 2009 || Kitt Peak || Spacewatch || LIX || align=right | 4.3 km || 
|-id=189 bgcolor=#d6d6d6
| 432189 ||  || — || February 19, 2009 || Mount Lemmon || Mount Lemmon Survey || — || align=right | 2.7 km || 
|-id=190 bgcolor=#d6d6d6
| 432190 ||  || — || February 19, 2009 || Kitt Peak || Spacewatch || — || align=right | 2.4 km || 
|-id=191 bgcolor=#d6d6d6
| 432191 ||  || — || February 20, 2009 || Kitt Peak || Spacewatch || — || align=right | 2.8 km || 
|-id=192 bgcolor=#d6d6d6
| 432192 ||  || — || December 30, 2008 || Mount Lemmon || Mount Lemmon Survey || THB || align=right | 3.2 km || 
|-id=193 bgcolor=#d6d6d6
| 432193 ||  || — || February 22, 2009 || Catalina || CSS || — || align=right | 4.2 km || 
|-id=194 bgcolor=#d6d6d6
| 432194 ||  || — || February 21, 2009 || Mount Lemmon || Mount Lemmon Survey || — || align=right | 2.1 km || 
|-id=195 bgcolor=#d6d6d6
| 432195 ||  || — || December 22, 2008 || Kitt Peak || Spacewatch || HYG || align=right | 2.1 km || 
|-id=196 bgcolor=#d6d6d6
| 432196 ||  || — || February 21, 2009 || Mount Lemmon || Mount Lemmon Survey || — || align=right | 3.4 km || 
|-id=197 bgcolor=#d6d6d6
| 432197 ||  || — || January 25, 2009 || Kitt Peak || Spacewatch || — || align=right | 3.0 km || 
|-id=198 bgcolor=#d6d6d6
| 432198 ||  || — || January 30, 2009 || Kitt Peak || Spacewatch || — || align=right | 2.4 km || 
|-id=199 bgcolor=#d6d6d6
| 432199 ||  || — || December 30, 2008 || Mount Lemmon || Mount Lemmon Survey || VER || align=right | 2.9 km || 
|-id=200 bgcolor=#d6d6d6
| 432200 ||  || — || February 21, 2009 || Kitt Peak || Spacewatch || — || align=right | 2.7 km || 
|}

432201–432300 

|-bgcolor=#d6d6d6
| 432201 ||  || — || February 27, 2009 || Kitt Peak || Spacewatch || — || align=right | 2.9 km || 
|-id=202 bgcolor=#d6d6d6
| 432202 ||  || — || February 3, 2009 || Mount Lemmon || Mount Lemmon Survey || — || align=right | 2.8 km || 
|-id=203 bgcolor=#d6d6d6
| 432203 ||  || — || February 28, 2009 || Mount Lemmon || Mount Lemmon Survey || — || align=right | 2.7 km || 
|-id=204 bgcolor=#d6d6d6
| 432204 ||  || — || February 25, 2009 || Catalina || CSS ||  || align=right | 3.2 km || 
|-id=205 bgcolor=#d6d6d6
| 432205 ||  || — || February 26, 2009 || Kitt Peak || Spacewatch || — || align=right | 3.0 km || 
|-id=206 bgcolor=#d6d6d6
| 432206 ||  || — || February 23, 2009 || La Sagra || OAM Obs. || LIX || align=right | 3.5 km || 
|-id=207 bgcolor=#d6d6d6
| 432207 ||  || — || February 27, 2009 || Kitt Peak || Spacewatch || — || align=right | 3.0 km || 
|-id=208 bgcolor=#d6d6d6
| 432208 ||  || — || February 26, 2009 || Cerro Burek || Alianza S4 Obs. || — || align=right | 5.5 km || 
|-id=209 bgcolor=#d6d6d6
| 432209 ||  || — || February 3, 2009 || Kitt Peak || Spacewatch || — || align=right | 3.5 km || 
|-id=210 bgcolor=#d6d6d6
| 432210 ||  || — || March 1, 2009 || Kitt Peak || Spacewatch || HYG || align=right | 3.2 km || 
|-id=211 bgcolor=#d6d6d6
| 432211 ||  || — || February 5, 2009 || Kitt Peak || Spacewatch || — || align=right | 2.9 km || 
|-id=212 bgcolor=#d6d6d6
| 432212 ||  || — || February 19, 2009 || Kitt Peak || Spacewatch || — || align=right | 2.8 km || 
|-id=213 bgcolor=#d6d6d6
| 432213 ||  || — || March 1, 2009 || Kitt Peak || Spacewatch || — || align=right | 3.0 km || 
|-id=214 bgcolor=#d6d6d6
| 432214 ||  || — || February 19, 2009 || Mount Lemmon || Mount Lemmon Survey || — || align=right | 2.5 km || 
|-id=215 bgcolor=#d6d6d6
| 432215 ||  || — || March 22, 2009 || Catalina || CSS || — || align=right | 3.2 km || 
|-id=216 bgcolor=#d6d6d6
| 432216 ||  || — || February 5, 2009 || Kitt Peak || Spacewatch || — || align=right | 3.2 km || 
|-id=217 bgcolor=#d6d6d6
| 432217 ||  || — || March 18, 2009 || Catalina || CSS || — || align=right | 3.2 km || 
|-id=218 bgcolor=#d6d6d6
| 432218 ||  || — || March 22, 2009 || La Sagra || OAM Obs. || — || align=right | 3.5 km || 
|-id=219 bgcolor=#d6d6d6
| 432219 ||  || — || February 24, 2009 || Kitt Peak || Spacewatch || — || align=right | 2.5 km || 
|-id=220 bgcolor=#d6d6d6
| 432220 ||  || — || February 20, 2009 || Kitt Peak || Spacewatch || — || align=right | 2.7 km || 
|-id=221 bgcolor=#d6d6d6
| 432221 ||  || — || March 21, 2009 || Kitt Peak || Spacewatch || — || align=right | 2.9 km || 
|-id=222 bgcolor=#d6d6d6
| 432222 ||  || — || March 16, 2009 || Kitt Peak || Spacewatch || — || align=right | 3.6 km || 
|-id=223 bgcolor=#d6d6d6
| 432223 ||  || — || April 16, 2004 || Socorro || LINEAR || — || align=right | 3.2 km || 
|-id=224 bgcolor=#d6d6d6
| 432224 ||  || — || September 25, 1995 || Kitt Peak || Spacewatch || — || align=right | 3.2 km || 
|-id=225 bgcolor=#d6d6d6
| 432225 ||  || — || February 26, 2009 || Catalina || CSS || Tj (2.99) || align=right | 4.3 km || 
|-id=226 bgcolor=#FFC2E0
| 432226 ||  || — || April 19, 2009 || Kitt Peak || Spacewatch || AMO || align=right data-sort-value="0.69" | 690 m || 
|-id=227 bgcolor=#d6d6d6
| 432227 ||  || — || February 20, 2009 || Kitt Peak || Spacewatch || — || align=right | 3.0 km || 
|-id=228 bgcolor=#d6d6d6
| 432228 ||  || — || April 18, 2009 || Mount Lemmon || Mount Lemmon Survey || THB || align=right | 2.9 km || 
|-id=229 bgcolor=#d6d6d6
| 432229 ||  || — || April 19, 2009 || Piszkéstető || K. Sárneczky || — || align=right | 2.5 km || 
|-id=230 bgcolor=#d6d6d6
| 432230 ||  || — || April 17, 2009 || Catalina || CSS || — || align=right | 3.9 km || 
|-id=231 bgcolor=#d6d6d6
| 432231 ||  || — || April 18, 2009 || Mount Lemmon || Mount Lemmon Survey || — || align=right | 3.1 km || 
|-id=232 bgcolor=#d6d6d6
| 432232 ||  || — || April 25, 2009 || Andrushivka || Andrushivka Obs. || Tj (2.99) || align=right | 4.4 km || 
|-id=233 bgcolor=#d6d6d6
| 432233 ||  || — || April 17, 2009 || Catalina || CSS || — || align=right | 3.3 km || 
|-id=234 bgcolor=#fefefe
| 432234 ||  || — || April 29, 2009 || Kitt Peak || Spacewatch || — || align=right data-sort-value="0.64" | 640 m || 
|-id=235 bgcolor=#fefefe
| 432235 ||  || — || May 18, 2009 || Mount Lemmon || Mount Lemmon Survey || — || align=right data-sort-value="0.71" | 710 m || 
|-id=236 bgcolor=#fefefe
| 432236 ||  || — || July 15, 2009 || La Sagra || OAM Obs. || — || align=right data-sort-value="0.79" | 790 m || 
|-id=237 bgcolor=#fefefe
| 432237 ||  || — || July 31, 2009 || Siding Spring || SSS || — || align=right | 1.3 km || 
|-id=238 bgcolor=#fefefe
| 432238 ||  || — || July 27, 2009 || Catalina || CSS || — || align=right data-sort-value="0.72" | 720 m || 
|-id=239 bgcolor=#fefefe
| 432239 ||  || — || June 24, 2009 || Mount Lemmon || Mount Lemmon Survey || — || align=right data-sort-value="0.65" | 650 m || 
|-id=240 bgcolor=#fefefe
| 432240 ||  || — || June 19, 2009 || Kitt Peak || Spacewatch || — || align=right data-sort-value="0.72" | 720 m || 
|-id=241 bgcolor=#E9E9E9
| 432241 ||  || — || August 15, 2009 || Catalina || CSS || EUN || align=right | 1.3 km || 
|-id=242 bgcolor=#E9E9E9
| 432242 ||  || — || August 15, 2009 || Kitt Peak || Spacewatch || JUN || align=right data-sort-value="0.89" | 890 m || 
|-id=243 bgcolor=#fefefe
| 432243 ||  || — || August 16, 2009 || Kitt Peak || Spacewatch || — || align=right data-sort-value="0.77" | 770 m || 
|-id=244 bgcolor=#fefefe
| 432244 ||  || — || August 17, 2009 || Catalina || CSS || — || align=right data-sort-value="0.95" | 950 m || 
|-id=245 bgcolor=#E9E9E9
| 432245 ||  || — || August 20, 2009 || Kitt Peak || Spacewatch || — || align=right | 1.8 km || 
|-id=246 bgcolor=#fefefe
| 432246 ||  || — || August 26, 2009 || La Sagra || OAM Obs. || — || align=right data-sort-value="0.82" | 820 m || 
|-id=247 bgcolor=#E9E9E9
| 432247 ||  || — || August 18, 2009 || Kitt Peak || Spacewatch || EUN || align=right data-sort-value="0.93" | 930 m || 
|-id=248 bgcolor=#fefefe
| 432248 ||  || — || November 23, 2006 || Kitt Peak || Spacewatch || — || align=right data-sort-value="0.88" | 880 m || 
|-id=249 bgcolor=#fefefe
| 432249 ||  || — || September 9, 2009 || La Sagra || OAM Obs. || — || align=right data-sort-value="0.84" | 840 m || 
|-id=250 bgcolor=#fefefe
| 432250 ||  || — || September 12, 2009 || Kitt Peak || Spacewatch || — || align=right data-sort-value="0.79" | 790 m || 
|-id=251 bgcolor=#fefefe
| 432251 ||  || — || September 12, 2009 || Kitt Peak || Spacewatch || — || align=right data-sort-value="0.59" | 590 m || 
|-id=252 bgcolor=#fefefe
| 432252 ||  || — || September 14, 2009 || Catalina || CSS || — || align=right | 1.1 km || 
|-id=253 bgcolor=#fefefe
| 432253 ||  || — || September 14, 2009 || Kitt Peak || Spacewatch || — || align=right data-sort-value="0.95" | 950 m || 
|-id=254 bgcolor=#E9E9E9
| 432254 ||  || — || September 15, 2009 || Kitt Peak || Spacewatch || EUN || align=right | 1.1 km || 
|-id=255 bgcolor=#fefefe
| 432255 ||  || — || September 15, 2009 || Kitt Peak || Spacewatch || — || align=right data-sort-value="0.73" | 730 m || 
|-id=256 bgcolor=#fefefe
| 432256 ||  || — || September 14, 2009 || Socorro || LINEAR || NYS || align=right data-sort-value="0.70" | 700 m || 
|-id=257 bgcolor=#fefefe
| 432257 ||  || — || September 15, 2009 || Kitt Peak || Spacewatch || V || align=right data-sort-value="0.60" | 600 m || 
|-id=258 bgcolor=#E9E9E9
| 432258 ||  || — || September 15, 2009 || Kitt Peak || Spacewatch || — || align=right data-sort-value="0.76" | 760 m || 
|-id=259 bgcolor=#fefefe
| 432259 ||  || — || September 15, 2009 || Kitt Peak || Spacewatch || V || align=right data-sort-value="0.89" | 890 m || 
|-id=260 bgcolor=#C2FFFF
| 432260 ||  || — || September 12, 2009 || Kitt Peak || Spacewatch || L4 || align=right | 8.2 km || 
|-id=261 bgcolor=#C2FFFF
| 432261 ||  || — || September 15, 2009 || Kitt Peak || Spacewatch || L4 || align=right | 7.6 km || 
|-id=262 bgcolor=#fefefe
| 432262 ||  || — || September 18, 2009 || Nazaret || G. Muler || — || align=right data-sort-value="0.87" | 870 m || 
|-id=263 bgcolor=#fefefe
| 432263 ||  || — || September 18, 2009 || Kitt Peak || Spacewatch || — || align=right data-sort-value="0.78" | 780 m || 
|-id=264 bgcolor=#C2FFFF
| 432264 ||  || — || September 16, 2009 || Kitt Peak || Spacewatch || L4 || align=right | 8.6 km || 
|-id=265 bgcolor=#d6d6d6
| 432265 ||  || — || September 16, 2009 || Kitt Peak || Spacewatch || 3:2 || align=right | 4.2 km || 
|-id=266 bgcolor=#fefefe
| 432266 ||  || — || September 16, 2009 || Kitt Peak || Spacewatch || V || align=right data-sort-value="0.61" | 610 m || 
|-id=267 bgcolor=#C2FFFF
| 432267 ||  || — || September 16, 2009 || Kitt Peak || Spacewatch || L4 || align=right | 10 km || 
|-id=268 bgcolor=#fefefe
| 432268 ||  || — || September 16, 2009 || Kitt Peak || Spacewatch || — || align=right | 1.0 km || 
|-id=269 bgcolor=#fefefe
| 432269 ||  || — || September 16, 2009 || Kitt Peak || Spacewatch || — || align=right data-sort-value="0.73" | 730 m || 
|-id=270 bgcolor=#fefefe
| 432270 ||  || — || September 17, 2009 || Kitt Peak || Spacewatch || V || align=right data-sort-value="0.59" | 590 m || 
|-id=271 bgcolor=#C2FFFF
| 432271 ||  || — || September 17, 2009 || Kitt Peak || Spacewatch || L4 || align=right | 8.3 km || 
|-id=272 bgcolor=#E9E9E9
| 432272 ||  || — || September 17, 2009 || Kitt Peak || Spacewatch || — || align=right | 1.2 km || 
|-id=273 bgcolor=#fefefe
| 432273 ||  || — || September 18, 2009 || Mount Lemmon || Mount Lemmon Survey || — || align=right data-sort-value="0.80" | 800 m || 
|-id=274 bgcolor=#C2FFFF
| 432274 ||  || — || September 19, 2009 || Kitt Peak || Spacewatch || L4 || align=right | 7.4 km || 
|-id=275 bgcolor=#fefefe
| 432275 ||  || — || April 14, 2008 || Mount Lemmon || Mount Lemmon Survey || V || align=right data-sort-value="0.62" | 620 m || 
|-id=276 bgcolor=#E9E9E9
| 432276 ||  || — || September 18, 2009 || Kitt Peak || Spacewatch || (5) || align=right data-sort-value="0.64" | 640 m || 
|-id=277 bgcolor=#E9E9E9
| 432277 ||  || — || September 18, 2009 || Kitt Peak || Spacewatch || NEM || align=right | 1.7 km || 
|-id=278 bgcolor=#d6d6d6
| 432278 ||  || — || September 19, 2009 || Mount Lemmon || Mount Lemmon Survey || SHU3:2 || align=right | 6.5 km || 
|-id=279 bgcolor=#fefefe
| 432279 ||  || — || September 20, 2009 || Kitt Peak || Spacewatch || — || align=right data-sort-value="0.88" | 880 m || 
|-id=280 bgcolor=#fefefe
| 432280 ||  || — || August 16, 2009 || Kitt Peak || Spacewatch || — || align=right data-sort-value="0.68" | 680 m || 
|-id=281 bgcolor=#E9E9E9
| 432281 ||  || — || September 26, 2009 || Calvin-Rehoboth || L. A. Molnar || (5) || align=right data-sort-value="0.83" | 830 m || 
|-id=282 bgcolor=#fefefe
| 432282 ||  || — || August 17, 2009 || Kitt Peak || Spacewatch || — || align=right data-sort-value="0.90" | 900 m || 
|-id=283 bgcolor=#fefefe
| 432283 ||  || — || September 22, 2009 || Kitt Peak || Spacewatch || — || align=right data-sort-value="0.85" | 850 m || 
|-id=284 bgcolor=#E9E9E9
| 432284 ||  || — || September 15, 2009 || Kitt Peak || Spacewatch || (5) || align=right data-sort-value="0.63" | 630 m || 
|-id=285 bgcolor=#C2FFFF
| 432285 ||  || — || September 23, 2009 || Kitt Peak || Spacewatch || L4 || align=right | 7.1 km || 
|-id=286 bgcolor=#fefefe
| 432286 ||  || — || September 23, 2009 || Kitt Peak || Spacewatch || — || align=right data-sort-value="0.71" | 710 m || 
|-id=287 bgcolor=#fefefe
| 432287 ||  || — || September 23, 2009 || Kitt Peak || Spacewatch || NYS || align=right data-sort-value="0.61" | 610 m || 
|-id=288 bgcolor=#C2FFFF
| 432288 ||  || — || September 18, 2009 || Kitt Peak || Spacewatch || L4 || align=right | 11 km || 
|-id=289 bgcolor=#E9E9E9
| 432289 ||  || — || September 19, 2009 || Kitt Peak || Spacewatch || — || align=right data-sort-value="0.74" | 740 m || 
|-id=290 bgcolor=#E9E9E9
| 432290 ||  || — || September 15, 2009 || Kitt Peak || Spacewatch || — || align=right | 1.1 km || 
|-id=291 bgcolor=#fefefe
| 432291 ||  || — || August 29, 2009 || Kitt Peak || Spacewatch || — || align=right | 1.6 km || 
|-id=292 bgcolor=#fefefe
| 432292 ||  || — || September 24, 2009 || Kitt Peak || Spacewatch || — || align=right data-sort-value="0.74" | 740 m || 
|-id=293 bgcolor=#fefefe
| 432293 ||  || — || September 16, 2009 || Kitt Peak || Spacewatch || MAS || align=right data-sort-value="0.76" | 760 m || 
|-id=294 bgcolor=#C2FFFF
| 432294 ||  || — || September 20, 2009 || Kitt Peak || Spacewatch || L4 || align=right | 8.0 km || 
|-id=295 bgcolor=#fefefe
| 432295 ||  || — || September 25, 2009 || Catalina || CSS || — || align=right data-sort-value="0.94" | 940 m || 
|-id=296 bgcolor=#E9E9E9
| 432296 ||  || — || September 25, 2009 || Kitt Peak || Spacewatch || — || align=right data-sort-value="0.64" | 640 m || 
|-id=297 bgcolor=#fefefe
| 432297 ||  || — || September 25, 2009 || Kitt Peak || Spacewatch || — || align=right | 1.0 km || 
|-id=298 bgcolor=#fefefe
| 432298 ||  || — || September 27, 2009 || Catalina || CSS || — || align=right data-sort-value="0.73" | 730 m || 
|-id=299 bgcolor=#E9E9E9
| 432299 ||  || — || March 11, 2007 || Kitt Peak || Spacewatch || — || align=right | 1.3 km || 
|-id=300 bgcolor=#C2FFFF
| 432300 ||  || — || September 17, 2009 || Kitt Peak || Spacewatch || L4 || align=right | 8.5 km || 
|}

432301–432400 

|-bgcolor=#C2FFFF
| 432301 ||  || — || September 17, 2009 || Kitt Peak || Spacewatch || L4 || align=right | 9.8 km || 
|-id=302 bgcolor=#E9E9E9
| 432302 ||  || — || September 17, 2009 || Kitt Peak || Spacewatch || — || align=right data-sort-value="0.79" | 790 m || 
|-id=303 bgcolor=#fefefe
| 432303 ||  || — || September 19, 2009 || Kitt Peak || Spacewatch || — || align=right data-sort-value="0.78" | 780 m || 
|-id=304 bgcolor=#fefefe
| 432304 ||  || — || September 22, 2009 || Kitt Peak || Spacewatch || — || align=right data-sort-value="0.73" | 730 m || 
|-id=305 bgcolor=#C2FFFF
| 432305 ||  || — || September 19, 2009 || Kitt Peak || Spacewatch || L4 || align=right | 7.6 km || 
|-id=306 bgcolor=#C2FFFF
| 432306 ||  || — || September 25, 2009 || Kitt Peak || Spacewatch || L4 || align=right | 7.1 km || 
|-id=307 bgcolor=#fefefe
| 432307 ||  || — || September 25, 2009 || Catalina || CSS || — || align=right data-sort-value="0.83" | 830 m || 
|-id=308 bgcolor=#FA8072
| 432308 ||  || — || October 11, 2009 || La Sagra || OAM Obs. || — || align=right | 1.0 km || 
|-id=309 bgcolor=#E9E9E9
| 432309 ||  || — || September 23, 2009 || Kitt Peak || Spacewatch || — || align=right | 2.2 km || 
|-id=310 bgcolor=#E9E9E9
| 432310 ||  || — || October 1, 2009 || Mount Lemmon || Mount Lemmon Survey || JUN || align=right | 1.3 km || 
|-id=311 bgcolor=#fefefe
| 432311 ||  || — || October 2, 2009 || Mount Lemmon || Mount Lemmon Survey || NYS || align=right data-sort-value="0.69" | 690 m || 
|-id=312 bgcolor=#fefefe
| 432312 ||  || — || October 9, 2009 || Catalina || CSS || — || align=right data-sort-value="0.86" | 860 m || 
|-id=313 bgcolor=#fefefe
| 432313 ||  || — || October 11, 2009 || La Sagra || OAM Obs. || — || align=right | 1.0 km || 
|-id=314 bgcolor=#fefefe
| 432314 ||  || — || September 28, 2009 || Mount Lemmon || Mount Lemmon Survey || — || align=right data-sort-value="0.88" | 880 m || 
|-id=315 bgcolor=#E9E9E9
| 432315 ||  || — || September 18, 2009 || Catalina || CSS || — || align=right | 2.3 km || 
|-id=316 bgcolor=#fefefe
| 432316 ||  || — || September 25, 2009 || Kitt Peak || Spacewatch || — || align=right data-sort-value="0.87" | 870 m || 
|-id=317 bgcolor=#fefefe
| 432317 ||  || — || October 2, 2009 || Mount Lemmon || Mount Lemmon Survey || — || align=right data-sort-value="0.89" | 890 m || 
|-id=318 bgcolor=#E9E9E9
| 432318 ||  || — || October 18, 2009 || Mount Lemmon || Mount Lemmon Survey || — || align=right | 1.0 km || 
|-id=319 bgcolor=#fefefe
| 432319 ||  || — || October 21, 2009 || Catalina || CSS || V || align=right data-sort-value="0.75" | 750 m || 
|-id=320 bgcolor=#E9E9E9
| 432320 ||  || — || October 18, 2009 || Mount Lemmon || Mount Lemmon Survey || — || align=right | 1.5 km || 
|-id=321 bgcolor=#E9E9E9
| 432321 ||  || — || September 21, 2009 || Mount Lemmon || Mount Lemmon Survey || — || align=right data-sort-value="0.94" | 940 m || 
|-id=322 bgcolor=#E9E9E9
| 432322 ||  || — || October 21, 2009 || Catalina || CSS || EUN || align=right | 1.6 km || 
|-id=323 bgcolor=#E9E9E9
| 432323 ||  || — || September 22, 2009 || Mount Lemmon || Mount Lemmon Survey || — || align=right | 1.1 km || 
|-id=324 bgcolor=#C2FFFF
| 432324 ||  || — || September 26, 2009 || Kitt Peak || Spacewatch || L4 || align=right | 8.0 km || 
|-id=325 bgcolor=#C2FFFF
| 432325 ||  || — || October 22, 2009 || Mount Lemmon || Mount Lemmon Survey || L4 || align=right | 9.3 km || 
|-id=326 bgcolor=#E9E9E9
| 432326 ||  || — || September 22, 2009 || Mount Lemmon || Mount Lemmon Survey || — || align=right | 1.2 km || 
|-id=327 bgcolor=#fefefe
| 432327 ||  || — || October 23, 2009 || Mount Lemmon || Mount Lemmon Survey || — || align=right data-sort-value="0.77" | 770 m || 
|-id=328 bgcolor=#fefefe
| 432328 ||  || — || October 22, 2009 || Bisei SG Center || BATTeRS || — || align=right data-sort-value="0.81" | 810 m || 
|-id=329 bgcolor=#E9E9E9
| 432329 ||  || — || October 24, 2009 || Catalina || CSS || — || align=right | 1.5 km || 
|-id=330 bgcolor=#E9E9E9
| 432330 ||  || — || September 18, 2009 || Mount Lemmon || Mount Lemmon Survey || — || align=right data-sort-value="0.85" | 850 m || 
|-id=331 bgcolor=#E9E9E9
| 432331 ||  || — || October 23, 2009 || Kitt Peak || Spacewatch || — || align=right data-sort-value="0.91" | 910 m || 
|-id=332 bgcolor=#E9E9E9
| 432332 ||  || — || October 21, 2009 || Catalina || CSS || — || align=right | 1.4 km || 
|-id=333 bgcolor=#fefefe
| 432333 ||  || — || October 25, 2009 || Kitt Peak || Spacewatch || — || align=right data-sort-value="0.87" | 870 m || 
|-id=334 bgcolor=#E9E9E9
| 432334 ||  || — || October 24, 2009 || Catalina || CSS || — || align=right | 1.5 km || 
|-id=335 bgcolor=#E9E9E9
| 432335 ||  || — || September 18, 2009 || Catalina || CSS || — || align=right | 1.6 km || 
|-id=336 bgcolor=#E9E9E9
| 432336 ||  || — || October 18, 2009 || Mount Lemmon || Mount Lemmon Survey || — || align=right | 1.6 km || 
|-id=337 bgcolor=#E9E9E9
| 432337 ||  || — || October 17, 2009 || Mount Lemmon || Mount Lemmon Survey || MAR || align=right | 1.0 km || 
|-id=338 bgcolor=#E9E9E9
| 432338 ||  || — || November 8, 2009 || Kitt Peak || Spacewatch || — || align=right | 1.5 km || 
|-id=339 bgcolor=#E9E9E9
| 432339 ||  || — || October 26, 2009 || Mount Lemmon || Mount Lemmon Survey || — || align=right | 2.3 km || 
|-id=340 bgcolor=#C2FFFF
| 432340 ||  || — || October 25, 2009 || Kitt Peak || Spacewatch || L4 || align=right | 14 km || 
|-id=341 bgcolor=#E9E9E9
| 432341 ||  || — || November 9, 2009 || Catalina || CSS || — || align=right | 1.9 km || 
|-id=342 bgcolor=#E9E9E9
| 432342 ||  || — || October 15, 2009 || Socorro || LINEAR || — || align=right | 2.1 km || 
|-id=343 bgcolor=#fefefe
| 432343 ||  || — || October 9, 2002 || Socorro || LINEAR || — || align=right data-sort-value="0.85" | 850 m || 
|-id=344 bgcolor=#E9E9E9
| 432344 ||  || — || November 9, 2009 || Kitt Peak || Spacewatch || — || align=right | 1.1 km || 
|-id=345 bgcolor=#fefefe
| 432345 ||  || — || November 8, 2009 || Catalina || CSS || — || align=right | 1.0 km || 
|-id=346 bgcolor=#E9E9E9
| 432346 ||  || — || November 11, 2009 || Kitt Peak || Spacewatch || — || align=right | 1.3 km || 
|-id=347 bgcolor=#E9E9E9
| 432347 ||  || — || November 14, 2009 || Mayhill || A. Lowe || — || align=right | 1.00 km || 
|-id=348 bgcolor=#E9E9E9
| 432348 ||  || — || November 8, 2009 || Kitt Peak || Spacewatch || — || align=right | 1.6 km || 
|-id=349 bgcolor=#E9E9E9
| 432349 ||  || — || November 9, 2009 || Kitt Peak || Spacewatch || — || align=right data-sort-value="0.69" | 690 m || 
|-id=350 bgcolor=#E9E9E9
| 432350 ||  || — || November 9, 2009 || Kitt Peak || Spacewatch || — || align=right | 1.2 km || 
|-id=351 bgcolor=#fefefe
| 432351 ||  || — || November 9, 2009 || Kitt Peak || Spacewatch || — || align=right | 1.1 km || 
|-id=352 bgcolor=#E9E9E9
| 432352 ||  || — || November 8, 2009 || Catalina || CSS || — || align=right | 1.4 km || 
|-id=353 bgcolor=#fefefe
| 432353 ||  || — || October 21, 2009 || Catalina || CSS || — || align=right data-sort-value="0.99" | 990 m || 
|-id=354 bgcolor=#fefefe
| 432354 ||  || — || September 27, 2009 || Mount Lemmon || Mount Lemmon Survey || — || align=right data-sort-value="0.94" | 940 m || 
|-id=355 bgcolor=#E9E9E9
| 432355 ||  || — || November 8, 2009 || Kitt Peak || Spacewatch || (5) || align=right data-sort-value="0.85" | 850 m || 
|-id=356 bgcolor=#C2FFFF
| 432356 ||  || — || November 10, 2009 || Mount Lemmon || Mount Lemmon Survey || L4 || align=right | 12 km || 
|-id=357 bgcolor=#E9E9E9
| 432357 ||  || — || November 10, 2009 || Kitt Peak || Spacewatch || — || align=right | 1.9 km || 
|-id=358 bgcolor=#E9E9E9
| 432358 ||  || — || November 11, 2009 || Mount Lemmon || Mount Lemmon Survey || — || align=right | 1.9 km || 
|-id=359 bgcolor=#E9E9E9
| 432359 ||  || — || November 16, 2009 || Mount Lemmon || Mount Lemmon Survey || EUN || align=right | 1.1 km || 
|-id=360 bgcolor=#E9E9E9
| 432360 ||  || — || November 19, 2009 || Kachina || J. Hobart || — || align=right | 1.1 km || 
|-id=361 bgcolor=#E9E9E9
| 432361 Rakovski ||  ||  || November 20, 2009 || Plana || F. Fratev || — || align=right data-sort-value="0.75" | 750 m || 
|-id=362 bgcolor=#C2FFFF
| 432362 ||  || — || October 16, 2009 || Mount Lemmon || Mount Lemmon Survey || L4 || align=right | 7.4 km || 
|-id=363 bgcolor=#E9E9E9
| 432363 ||  || — || November 16, 2009 || Kitt Peak || Spacewatch || — || align=right | 1.8 km || 
|-id=364 bgcolor=#E9E9E9
| 432364 ||  || — || November 16, 2009 || Kitt Peak || Spacewatch || — || align=right | 1.7 km || 
|-id=365 bgcolor=#E9E9E9
| 432365 ||  || — || November 16, 2009 || Mount Lemmon || Mount Lemmon Survey || — || align=right | 2.2 km || 
|-id=366 bgcolor=#E9E9E9
| 432366 ||  || — || October 12, 2009 || Mount Lemmon || Mount Lemmon Survey || — || align=right | 1.8 km || 
|-id=367 bgcolor=#E9E9E9
| 432367 ||  || — || November 17, 2009 || Mount Lemmon || Mount Lemmon Survey || — || align=right | 2.2 km || 
|-id=368 bgcolor=#E9E9E9
| 432368 ||  || — || September 19, 2009 || Mount Lemmon || Mount Lemmon Survey || — || align=right data-sort-value="0.88" | 880 m || 
|-id=369 bgcolor=#E9E9E9
| 432369 ||  || — || November 18, 2009 || Mount Lemmon || Mount Lemmon Survey || — || align=right data-sort-value="0.70" | 700 m || 
|-id=370 bgcolor=#fefefe
| 432370 ||  || — || November 18, 2009 || Kitt Peak || Spacewatch || — || align=right data-sort-value="0.99" | 990 m || 
|-id=371 bgcolor=#E9E9E9
| 432371 ||  || — || January 4, 2006 || Kitt Peak || Spacewatch || — || align=right | 1.1 km || 
|-id=372 bgcolor=#E9E9E9
| 432372 ||  || — || January 28, 2006 || Mount Lemmon || Mount Lemmon Survey || — || align=right | 1.9 km || 
|-id=373 bgcolor=#E9E9E9
| 432373 ||  || — || February 4, 2006 || Catalina || CSS || — || align=right | 1.5 km || 
|-id=374 bgcolor=#fefefe
| 432374 ||  || — || April 13, 2008 || Mount Lemmon || Mount Lemmon Survey || — || align=right data-sort-value="0.82" | 820 m || 
|-id=375 bgcolor=#E9E9E9
| 432375 ||  || — || November 20, 2009 || Kitt Peak || Spacewatch || — || align=right | 2.1 km || 
|-id=376 bgcolor=#E9E9E9
| 432376 ||  || — || December 2, 2005 || Kitt Peak || Spacewatch || (5) || align=right data-sort-value="0.72" | 720 m || 
|-id=377 bgcolor=#C2FFFF
| 432377 ||  || — || October 21, 2009 || Mount Lemmon || Mount Lemmon Survey || L4 || align=right | 14 km || 
|-id=378 bgcolor=#E9E9E9
| 432378 ||  || — || November 21, 2009 || Kitt Peak || Spacewatch || — || align=right data-sort-value="0.72" | 720 m || 
|-id=379 bgcolor=#E9E9E9
| 432379 ||  || — || November 22, 2009 || Kitt Peak || Spacewatch || — || align=right data-sort-value="0.92" | 920 m || 
|-id=380 bgcolor=#E9E9E9
| 432380 ||  || — || November 23, 2009 || Kitt Peak || Spacewatch || — || align=right | 2.2 km || 
|-id=381 bgcolor=#E9E9E9
| 432381 ||  || — || January 13, 2002 || Kitt Peak || Spacewatch || — || align=right | 1.2 km || 
|-id=382 bgcolor=#E9E9E9
| 432382 ||  || — || November 24, 2009 || Mount Lemmon || Mount Lemmon Survey || (5) || align=right data-sort-value="0.56" | 560 m || 
|-id=383 bgcolor=#E9E9E9
| 432383 ||  || — || November 30, 2005 || Kitt Peak || Spacewatch || MAR || align=right | 1.1 km || 
|-id=384 bgcolor=#E9E9E9
| 432384 ||  || — || November 17, 2009 || Kitt Peak || Spacewatch || — || align=right | 1.4 km || 
|-id=385 bgcolor=#E9E9E9
| 432385 ||  || — || November 17, 2009 || Kitt Peak || Spacewatch || — || align=right | 1.3 km || 
|-id=386 bgcolor=#E9E9E9
| 432386 ||  || — || November 17, 2009 || Kitt Peak || Spacewatch || — || align=right data-sort-value="0.89" | 890 m || 
|-id=387 bgcolor=#E9E9E9
| 432387 ||  || — || November 6, 2005 || Mount Lemmon || Mount Lemmon Survey || — || align=right data-sort-value="0.99" | 990 m || 
|-id=388 bgcolor=#E9E9E9
| 432388 ||  || — || September 21, 2009 || Mount Lemmon || Mount Lemmon Survey || — || align=right | 1.3 km || 
|-id=389 bgcolor=#E9E9E9
| 432389 ||  || — || November 19, 2009 || Mount Lemmon || Mount Lemmon Survey || (5) || align=right | 1.1 km || 
|-id=390 bgcolor=#fefefe
| 432390 ||  || — || April 13, 2004 || Kitt Peak || Spacewatch || V || align=right data-sort-value="0.67" | 670 m || 
|-id=391 bgcolor=#E9E9E9
| 432391 ||  || — || November 19, 2009 || Catalina || CSS || — || align=right | 1.2 km || 
|-id=392 bgcolor=#C2FFFF
| 432392 ||  || — || December 13, 2009 || Mount Lemmon || Mount Lemmon Survey || L4 || align=right | 10 km || 
|-id=393 bgcolor=#E9E9E9
| 432393 ||  || — || November 16, 2009 || Kitt Peak || Spacewatch || — || align=right | 1.3 km || 
|-id=394 bgcolor=#E9E9E9
| 432394 ||  || — || November 20, 2009 || Kitt Peak || Spacewatch || — || align=right | 2.0 km || 
|-id=395 bgcolor=#E9E9E9
| 432395 ||  || — || December 10, 2009 || Mount Lemmon || Mount Lemmon Survey || MAR || align=right | 1.1 km || 
|-id=396 bgcolor=#E9E9E9
| 432396 ||  || — || October 25, 2009 || Kitt Peak || Spacewatch || — || align=right | 1.5 km || 
|-id=397 bgcolor=#E9E9E9
| 432397 ||  || — || December 17, 2009 || Mount Lemmon || Mount Lemmon Survey || EUN || align=right | 1.1 km || 
|-id=398 bgcolor=#E9E9E9
| 432398 ||  || — || December 17, 2009 || Mount Lemmon || Mount Lemmon Survey || — || align=right | 1.3 km || 
|-id=399 bgcolor=#E9E9E9
| 432399 ||  || — || December 17, 2009 || Mount Lemmon || Mount Lemmon Survey || — || align=right | 1.6 km || 
|-id=400 bgcolor=#E9E9E9
| 432400 ||  || — || November 16, 2009 || Mount Lemmon || Mount Lemmon Survey || — || align=right | 1.3 km || 
|}

432401–432500 

|-bgcolor=#E9E9E9
| 432401 ||  || — || December 18, 2009 || Mount Lemmon || Mount Lemmon Survey || — || align=right | 2.2 km || 
|-id=402 bgcolor=#E9E9E9
| 432402 ||  || — || December 27, 2009 || Kitt Peak || Spacewatch || EUN || align=right | 1.4 km || 
|-id=403 bgcolor=#E9E9E9
| 432403 ||  || — || December 17, 2009 || Mount Lemmon || Mount Lemmon Survey || EUN || align=right | 1.2 km || 
|-id=404 bgcolor=#E9E9E9
| 432404 ||  || — || November 21, 2009 || Mount Lemmon || Mount Lemmon Survey || — || align=right | 2.5 km || 
|-id=405 bgcolor=#E9E9E9
| 432405 ||  || — || January 4, 2010 || Kitt Peak || Spacewatch || — || align=right | 1.9 km || 
|-id=406 bgcolor=#E9E9E9
| 432406 ||  || — || January 4, 2010 || Kitt Peak || Spacewatch || — || align=right | 1.2 km || 
|-id=407 bgcolor=#E9E9E9
| 432407 ||  || — || January 7, 2010 || Tzec Maun || Tzec Maun Obs. || NEM || align=right | 2.2 km || 
|-id=408 bgcolor=#E9E9E9
| 432408 ||  || — || January 4, 2010 || Kitt Peak || Spacewatch || — || align=right | 2.4 km || 
|-id=409 bgcolor=#E9E9E9
| 432409 ||  || — || January 6, 2010 || Catalina || CSS || — || align=right | 2.6 km || 
|-id=410 bgcolor=#E9E9E9
| 432410 ||  || — || January 6, 2010 || Catalina || CSS || — || align=right | 2.3 km || 
|-id=411 bgcolor=#E9E9E9
| 432411 ||  || — || October 26, 2009 || Mount Lemmon || Mount Lemmon Survey || JUN || align=right | 1.2 km || 
|-id=412 bgcolor=#E9E9E9
| 432412 ||  || — || January 6, 2010 || Kitt Peak || Spacewatch || — || align=right | 2.1 km || 
|-id=413 bgcolor=#E9E9E9
| 432413 ||  || — || January 6, 2010 || Mount Lemmon || Mount Lemmon Survey || — || align=right | 2.8 km || 
|-id=414 bgcolor=#E9E9E9
| 432414 ||  || — || January 6, 2010 || Kitt Peak || Spacewatch || — || align=right | 2.9 km || 
|-id=415 bgcolor=#E9E9E9
| 432415 ||  || — || January 7, 2010 || Kitt Peak || Spacewatch || — || align=right | 1.9 km || 
|-id=416 bgcolor=#E9E9E9
| 432416 ||  || — || January 7, 2010 || Kitt Peak || Spacewatch || EUN || align=right | 1.1 km || 
|-id=417 bgcolor=#E9E9E9
| 432417 ||  || — || January 6, 2010 || Catalina || CSS || — || align=right | 2.9 km || 
|-id=418 bgcolor=#E9E9E9
| 432418 ||  || — || January 8, 2010 || Kitt Peak || Spacewatch || — || align=right | 2.8 km || 
|-id=419 bgcolor=#E9E9E9
| 432419 ||  || — || January 6, 2010 || Catalina || CSS || EUN || align=right | 1.4 km || 
|-id=420 bgcolor=#E9E9E9
| 432420 ||  || — || January 6, 2010 || Catalina || CSS || — || align=right | 1.7 km || 
|-id=421 bgcolor=#E9E9E9
| 432421 ||  || — || January 10, 2010 || Kitt Peak || Spacewatch || — || align=right | 2.9 km || 
|-id=422 bgcolor=#E9E9E9
| 432422 ||  || — || November 17, 2009 || Kitt Peak || Spacewatch || — || align=right | 2.0 km || 
|-id=423 bgcolor=#E9E9E9
| 432423 ||  || — || January 10, 2010 || Kitt Peak || Spacewatch || — || align=right | 2.1 km || 
|-id=424 bgcolor=#E9E9E9
| 432424 ||  || — || January 7, 2010 || WISE || WISE || — || align=right | 2.2 km || 
|-id=425 bgcolor=#d6d6d6
| 432425 ||  || — || January 8, 2010 || WISE || WISE || — || align=right | 6.6 km || 
|-id=426 bgcolor=#fefefe
| 432426 ||  || — || January 9, 2010 || WISE || WISE || — || align=right | 2.8 km || 
|-id=427 bgcolor=#d6d6d6
| 432427 ||  || — || January 2, 2009 || Mount Lemmon || Mount Lemmon Survey || — || align=right | 4.1 km || 
|-id=428 bgcolor=#C2FFFF
| 432428 ||  || — || January 12, 2010 || WISE || WISE || L4 || align=right | 13 km || 
|-id=429 bgcolor=#d6d6d6
| 432429 ||  || — || January 19, 2010 || WISE || WISE || — || align=right | 3.2 km || 
|-id=430 bgcolor=#d6d6d6
| 432430 ||  || — || January 20, 2010 || WISE || WISE || — || align=right | 3.6 km || 
|-id=431 bgcolor=#d6d6d6
| 432431 ||  || — || January 20, 2010 || WISE || WISE || — || align=right | 3.5 km || 
|-id=432 bgcolor=#d6d6d6
| 432432 ||  || — || January 21, 2010 || WISE || WISE || — || align=right | 3.7 km || 
|-id=433 bgcolor=#d6d6d6
| 432433 ||  || — || January 24, 2010 || WISE || WISE || — || align=right | 4.1 km || 
|-id=434 bgcolor=#d6d6d6
| 432434 ||  || — || January 25, 2010 || WISE || WISE || — || align=right | 5.1 km || 
|-id=435 bgcolor=#d6d6d6
| 432435 ||  || — || January 31, 2009 || Kitt Peak || Spacewatch || — || align=right | 3.0 km || 
|-id=436 bgcolor=#d6d6d6
| 432436 ||  || — || January 25, 2010 || WISE || WISE || — || align=right | 3.9 km || 
|-id=437 bgcolor=#d6d6d6
| 432437 ||  || — || January 26, 2010 || WISE || WISE || — || align=right | 3.7 km || 
|-id=438 bgcolor=#d6d6d6
| 432438 ||  || — || January 16, 2009 || Mount Lemmon || Mount Lemmon Survey || — || align=right | 4.4 km || 
|-id=439 bgcolor=#d6d6d6
| 432439 ||  || — || January 31, 2010 || WISE || WISE || — || align=right | 3.8 km || 
|-id=440 bgcolor=#d6d6d6
| 432440 ||  || — || February 8, 2010 || WISE || WISE || — || align=right | 4.0 km || 
|-id=441 bgcolor=#d6d6d6
| 432441 ||  || — || February 8, 2010 || WISE || WISE || — || align=right | 4.6 km || 
|-id=442 bgcolor=#E9E9E9
| 432442 ||  || — || September 23, 2008 || Kitt Peak || Spacewatch || — || align=right | 2.4 km || 
|-id=443 bgcolor=#E9E9E9
| 432443 ||  || — || January 12, 2010 || Kitt Peak || Spacewatch || AEO || align=right | 1.1 km || 
|-id=444 bgcolor=#d6d6d6
| 432444 ||  || — || August 27, 2006 || Kitt Peak || Spacewatch || — || align=right | 2.5 km || 
|-id=445 bgcolor=#E9E9E9
| 432445 ||  || — || December 20, 2009 || Mount Lemmon || Mount Lemmon Survey || — || align=right | 2.7 km || 
|-id=446 bgcolor=#d6d6d6
| 432446 ||  || — || February 11, 2010 || WISE || WISE || — || align=right | 5.0 km || 
|-id=447 bgcolor=#d6d6d6
| 432447 ||  || — || February 12, 2010 || WISE || WISE || LIX || align=right | 4.0 km || 
|-id=448 bgcolor=#E9E9E9
| 432448 ||  || — || September 4, 2008 || Kitt Peak || Spacewatch || — || align=right | 2.2 km || 
|-id=449 bgcolor=#E9E9E9
| 432449 ||  || — || February 10, 2010 || Kitt Peak || Spacewatch ||  || align=right | 2.0 km || 
|-id=450 bgcolor=#E9E9E9
| 432450 ||  || — || September 20, 2003 || Kitt Peak || Spacewatch || — || align=right | 2.0 km || 
|-id=451 bgcolor=#E9E9E9
| 432451 ||  || — || February 13, 2010 || Mount Lemmon || Mount Lemmon Survey || — || align=right | 2.0 km || 
|-id=452 bgcolor=#E9E9E9
| 432452 ||  || — || February 14, 2010 || Kitt Peak || Spacewatch || — || align=right | 2.0 km || 
|-id=453 bgcolor=#d6d6d6
| 432453 ||  || — || February 14, 2010 || Kitt Peak || Spacewatch || — || align=right | 2.6 km || 
|-id=454 bgcolor=#E9E9E9
| 432454 ||  || — || February 14, 2010 || Kitt Peak || Spacewatch || — || align=right | 2.1 km || 
|-id=455 bgcolor=#E9E9E9
| 432455 ||  || — || December 19, 2009 || Mount Lemmon || Mount Lemmon Survey || — || align=right | 1.8 km || 
|-id=456 bgcolor=#d6d6d6
| 432456 ||  || — || April 20, 2006 || Kitt Peak || Spacewatch || KOR || align=right | 1.3 km || 
|-id=457 bgcolor=#E9E9E9
| 432457 ||  || — || February 13, 2010 || LightBuckets || T. Vorobjov || — || align=right | 1.8 km || 
|-id=458 bgcolor=#E9E9E9
| 432458 ||  || — || January 5, 2010 || Kitt Peak || Spacewatch || — || align=right | 3.3 km || 
|-id=459 bgcolor=#d6d6d6
| 432459 ||  || — || February 15, 2010 || WISE || WISE || — || align=right | 4.7 km || 
|-id=460 bgcolor=#E9E9E9
| 432460 ||  || — || March 23, 2006 || Kitt Peak || Spacewatch || — || align=right | 1.7 km || 
|-id=461 bgcolor=#d6d6d6
| 432461 ||  || — || January 18, 2009 || Mount Lemmon || Mount Lemmon Survey || — || align=right | 2.4 km || 
|-id=462 bgcolor=#E9E9E9
| 432462 ||  || — || February 5, 2010 || Catalina || CSS || — || align=right | 3.2 km || 
|-id=463 bgcolor=#E9E9E9
| 432463 ||  || — || January 25, 1996 || Kitt Peak || Spacewatch || — || align=right | 1.9 km || 
|-id=464 bgcolor=#d6d6d6
| 432464 ||  || — || November 27, 2009 || Mount Lemmon || Mount Lemmon Survey || TEL || align=right | 1.7 km || 
|-id=465 bgcolor=#d6d6d6
| 432465 ||  || — || February 14, 2010 || Mount Lemmon || Mount Lemmon Survey || EOS || align=right | 1.8 km || 
|-id=466 bgcolor=#E9E9E9
| 432466 ||  || — || February 15, 2010 || Mount Lemmon || Mount Lemmon Survey || — || align=right | 1.9 km || 
|-id=467 bgcolor=#d6d6d6
| 432467 ||  || — || November 8, 2007 || Mount Lemmon || Mount Lemmon Survey || — || align=right | 3.7 km || 
|-id=468 bgcolor=#d6d6d6
| 432468 ||  || — || February 1, 2009 || Kitt Peak || Spacewatch || — || align=right | 4.7 km || 
|-id=469 bgcolor=#d6d6d6
| 432469 ||  || — || February 16, 2010 || Kitt Peak || Spacewatch || — || align=right | 5.2 km || 
|-id=470 bgcolor=#d6d6d6
| 432470 ||  || — || March 13, 2005 || Kitt Peak || Spacewatch || — || align=right | 2.4 km || 
|-id=471 bgcolor=#d6d6d6
| 432471 ||  || — || February 18, 2010 || WISE || WISE || — || align=right | 3.6 km || 
|-id=472 bgcolor=#d6d6d6
| 432472 ||  || — || February 20, 2010 || WISE || WISE || — || align=right | 3.1 km || 
|-id=473 bgcolor=#d6d6d6
| 432473 ||  || — || February 20, 2010 || WISE || WISE || — || align=right | 5.1 km || 
|-id=474 bgcolor=#d6d6d6
| 432474 ||  || — || February 13, 2010 || Mount Lemmon || Mount Lemmon Survey || — || align=right | 1.3 km || 
|-id=475 bgcolor=#d6d6d6
| 432475 ||  || — || February 17, 2010 || Kitt Peak || Spacewatch || — || align=right | 2.3 km || 
|-id=476 bgcolor=#d6d6d6
| 432476 ||  || — || February 23, 2010 || WISE || WISE || — || align=right | 5.2 km || 
|-id=477 bgcolor=#d6d6d6
| 432477 ||  || — || February 23, 2010 || WISE || WISE || — || align=right | 3.3 km || 
|-id=478 bgcolor=#d6d6d6
| 432478 ||  || — || February 24, 2010 || WISE || WISE || criticalTj (2.99) || align=right | 2.7 km || 
|-id=479 bgcolor=#d6d6d6
| 432479 ||  || — || February 24, 2010 || WISE || WISE || — || align=right | 3.2 km || 
|-id=480 bgcolor=#d6d6d6
| 432480 ||  || — || February 27, 2010 || WISE || WISE || — || align=right | 4.4 km || 
|-id=481 bgcolor=#d6d6d6
| 432481 ||  || — || February 28, 2010 || WISE || WISE || — || align=right | 4.8 km || 
|-id=482 bgcolor=#d6d6d6
| 432482 ||  || — || February 26, 2010 || WISE || WISE || — || align=right | 3.0 km || 
|-id=483 bgcolor=#E9E9E9
| 432483 ||  || — || March 1, 2005 || Kitt Peak || Spacewatch || — || align=right | 2.0 km || 
|-id=484 bgcolor=#E9E9E9
| 432484 ||  || — || May 20, 2006 || Kitt Peak || Spacewatch || — || align=right | 2.4 km || 
|-id=485 bgcolor=#d6d6d6
| 432485 ||  || — || March 4, 2010 || Kitt Peak || Spacewatch || — || align=right | 2.3 km || 
|-id=486 bgcolor=#d6d6d6
| 432486 ||  || — || March 12, 2010 || Mount Lemmon || Mount Lemmon Survey || — || align=right | 2.9 km || 
|-id=487 bgcolor=#d6d6d6
| 432487 ||  || — || March 12, 2010 || Mount Lemmon || Mount Lemmon Survey || — || align=right | 2.1 km || 
|-id=488 bgcolor=#d6d6d6
| 432488 ||  || — || March 12, 2010 || Catalina || CSS || — || align=right | 3.5 km || 
|-id=489 bgcolor=#E9E9E9
| 432489 ||  || — || February 24, 2006 || Kitt Peak || Spacewatch || — || align=right | 2.5 km || 
|-id=490 bgcolor=#d6d6d6
| 432490 ||  || — || March 12, 2010 || Kitt Peak || Spacewatch || — || align=right | 2.0 km || 
|-id=491 bgcolor=#d6d6d6
| 432491 ||  || — || March 12, 2010 || Mount Lemmon || Mount Lemmon Survey || BRA || align=right | 1.1 km || 
|-id=492 bgcolor=#d6d6d6
| 432492 ||  || — || March 12, 2010 || Mount Lemmon || Mount Lemmon Survey || — || align=right | 3.5 km || 
|-id=493 bgcolor=#d6d6d6
| 432493 ||  || — || March 13, 2010 || Kitt Peak || Spacewatch || — || align=right | 2.9 km || 
|-id=494 bgcolor=#E9E9E9
| 432494 ||  || — || August 22, 2003 || Campo Imperatore || CINEOS || — || align=right | 2.0 km || 
|-id=495 bgcolor=#d6d6d6
| 432495 ||  || — || March 14, 2010 || Kitt Peak || Spacewatch || — || align=right | 2.2 km || 
|-id=496 bgcolor=#d6d6d6
| 432496 ||  || — || March 17, 2005 || Mount Lemmon || Mount Lemmon Survey || — || align=right | 2.1 km || 
|-id=497 bgcolor=#E9E9E9
| 432497 ||  || — || September 17, 2003 || Kitt Peak || Spacewatch || GEF || align=right | 1.3 km || 
|-id=498 bgcolor=#d6d6d6
| 432498 ||  || — || March 13, 2010 || Kitt Peak || Spacewatch || — || align=right | 2.9 km || 
|-id=499 bgcolor=#d6d6d6
| 432499 ||  || — || March 13, 2010 || Mount Lemmon || Mount Lemmon Survey || — || align=right | 2.4 km || 
|-id=500 bgcolor=#d6d6d6
| 432500 ||  || — || March 15, 2010 || Mount Lemmon || Mount Lemmon Survey || EOS || align=right | 1.7 km || 
|}

432501–432600 

|-bgcolor=#d6d6d6
| 432501 ||  || — || March 12, 2010 || Kitt Peak || Spacewatch || — || align=right | 3.3 km || 
|-id=502 bgcolor=#d6d6d6
| 432502 ||  || — || March 14, 2010 || Kitt Peak || Spacewatch || — || align=right | 4.5 km || 
|-id=503 bgcolor=#d6d6d6
| 432503 ||  || — || March 11, 2010 || WISE || WISE || — || align=right | 3.5 km || 
|-id=504 bgcolor=#E9E9E9
| 432504 ||  || — || October 27, 2008 || Mount Lemmon || Mount Lemmon Survey || — || align=right | 2.6 km || 
|-id=505 bgcolor=#d6d6d6
| 432505 ||  || — || November 14, 1998 || Kitt Peak || Spacewatch || — || align=right | 2.5 km || 
|-id=506 bgcolor=#d6d6d6
| 432506 ||  || — || February 18, 2010 || Kitt Peak || Spacewatch || — || align=right | 2.4 km || 
|-id=507 bgcolor=#d6d6d6
| 432507 ||  || — || March 16, 2010 || Mount Lemmon || Mount Lemmon Survey || — || align=right | 3.9 km || 
|-id=508 bgcolor=#d6d6d6
| 432508 ||  || — || October 19, 2007 || Catalina || CSS || — || align=right | 3.6 km || 
|-id=509 bgcolor=#FFC2E0
| 432509 ||  || — || March 19, 2010 || Catalina || CSS || APO || align=right data-sort-value="0.45" | 450 m || 
|-id=510 bgcolor=#d6d6d6
| 432510 ||  || — || February 19, 2010 || Catalina || CSS || — || align=right | 4.5 km || 
|-id=511 bgcolor=#E9E9E9
| 432511 ||  || — || March 18, 2010 || Kitt Peak || Spacewatch || — || align=right | 2.5 km || 
|-id=512 bgcolor=#E9E9E9
| 432512 ||  || — || March 18, 2010 || Mount Lemmon || Mount Lemmon Survey || — || align=right | 3.7 km || 
|-id=513 bgcolor=#d6d6d6
| 432513 ||  || — || February 16, 2010 || Kitt Peak || Spacewatch || — || align=right | 3.7 km || 
|-id=514 bgcolor=#d6d6d6
| 432514 ||  || — || March 16, 2010 || Kitt Peak || Spacewatch || — || align=right | 2.6 km || 
|-id=515 bgcolor=#d6d6d6
| 432515 ||  || — || March 19, 1999 || Kitt Peak || Spacewatch || — || align=right | 2.6 km || 
|-id=516 bgcolor=#d6d6d6
| 432516 ||  || — || October 9, 2007 || Mount Lemmon || Mount Lemmon Survey || — || align=right | 3.0 km || 
|-id=517 bgcolor=#d6d6d6
| 432517 ||  || — || March 20, 2010 || Kitt Peak || Spacewatch || — || align=right | 2.6 km || 
|-id=518 bgcolor=#d6d6d6
| 432518 ||  || — || March 16, 2004 || Kitt Peak || Spacewatch || — || align=right | 2.8 km || 
|-id=519 bgcolor=#d6d6d6
| 432519 ||  || — || March 12, 2010 || Kitt Peak || Spacewatch || EOS || align=right | 1.8 km || 
|-id=520 bgcolor=#d6d6d6
| 432520 ||  || — || March 25, 2010 || Kitt Peak || Spacewatch || — || align=right | 3.7 km || 
|-id=521 bgcolor=#d6d6d6
| 432521 ||  || — || March 25, 2010 || Mount Lemmon || Mount Lemmon Survey || — || align=right | 3.1 km || 
|-id=522 bgcolor=#fefefe
| 432522 ||  || — || April 9, 2010 || Socorro || LINEAR || H || align=right data-sort-value="0.65" | 650 m || 
|-id=523 bgcolor=#d6d6d6
| 432523 ||  || — || April 5, 2010 || Catalina || CSS || Tj (2.99) || align=right | 4.7 km || 
|-id=524 bgcolor=#d6d6d6
| 432524 ||  || — || April 6, 2010 || Kitt Peak || Spacewatch || TIR || align=right | 2.6 km || 
|-id=525 bgcolor=#d6d6d6
| 432525 ||  || — || April 10, 2010 || Kitt Peak || Spacewatch || — || align=right | 3.4 km || 
|-id=526 bgcolor=#d6d6d6
| 432526 ||  || — || March 13, 2010 || Mount Lemmon || Mount Lemmon Survey || — || align=right | 3.3 km || 
|-id=527 bgcolor=#d6d6d6
| 432527 ||  || — || April 5, 2010 || Kitt Peak || Spacewatch || — || align=right | 1.9 km || 
|-id=528 bgcolor=#d6d6d6
| 432528 ||  || — || April 10, 2010 || Mount Lemmon || Mount Lemmon Survey || — || align=right | 3.7 km || 
|-id=529 bgcolor=#d6d6d6
| 432529 ||  || — || April 11, 2010 || Kitt Peak || Spacewatch || — || align=right | 2.0 km || 
|-id=530 bgcolor=#d6d6d6
| 432530 ||  || — || March 17, 2004 || Kitt Peak || Spacewatch || — || align=right | 2.6 km || 
|-id=531 bgcolor=#d6d6d6
| 432531 ||  || — || April 11, 2010 || Kitt Peak || Spacewatch || — || align=right | 4.3 km || 
|-id=532 bgcolor=#d6d6d6
| 432532 ||  || — || April 14, 2010 || Kitt Peak || Spacewatch || — || align=right | 2.6 km || 
|-id=533 bgcolor=#d6d6d6
| 432533 ||  || — || March 13, 2010 || Kitt Peak || Spacewatch || THM || align=right | 2.0 km || 
|-id=534 bgcolor=#d6d6d6
| 432534 ||  || — || August 23, 2001 || Kitt Peak || Spacewatch || — || align=right | 1.9 km || 
|-id=535 bgcolor=#d6d6d6
| 432535 ||  || — || March 15, 2004 || Kitt Peak || Spacewatch || EOS || align=right | 1.8 km || 
|-id=536 bgcolor=#d6d6d6
| 432536 ||  || — || January 15, 2010 || WISE || WISE || EMA || align=right | 3.1 km || 
|-id=537 bgcolor=#d6d6d6
| 432537 ||  || — || November 13, 2007 || Mount Lemmon || Mount Lemmon Survey || — || align=right | 2.4 km || 
|-id=538 bgcolor=#d6d6d6
| 432538 ||  || — || April 10, 2010 || Kitt Peak || Spacewatch || — || align=right | 3.0 km || 
|-id=539 bgcolor=#d6d6d6
| 432539 ||  || — || January 25, 2010 || WISE || WISE || — || align=right | 2.2 km || 
|-id=540 bgcolor=#d6d6d6
| 432540 ||  || — || January 27, 2010 || WISE || WISE || LIX || align=right | 3.3 km || 
|-id=541 bgcolor=#d6d6d6
| 432541 ||  || — || January 23, 2010 || WISE || WISE || — || align=right | 3.3 km || 
|-id=542 bgcolor=#E9E9E9
| 432542 ||  || — || December 2, 2004 || Anderson Mesa || LONEOS || DOR || align=right | 2.9 km || 
|-id=543 bgcolor=#d6d6d6
| 432543 ||  || — || September 27, 2006 || Kitt Peak || Spacewatch || — || align=right | 2.3 km || 
|-id=544 bgcolor=#d6d6d6
| 432544 ||  || — || April 17, 2010 || Mount Lemmon || Mount Lemmon Survey || — || align=right | 2.4 km || 
|-id=545 bgcolor=#d6d6d6
| 432545 ||  || — || April 20, 2010 || Kitt Peak || Spacewatch || — || align=right | 3.0 km || 
|-id=546 bgcolor=#d6d6d6
| 432546 ||  || — || April 26, 2010 || Mount Lemmon || Mount Lemmon Survey || — || align=right | 2.8 km || 
|-id=547 bgcolor=#d6d6d6
| 432547 ||  || — || April 15, 2010 || Kitt Peak || Spacewatch || — || align=right | 2.1 km || 
|-id=548 bgcolor=#d6d6d6
| 432548 ||  || — || July 11, 2005 || Mount Lemmon || Mount Lemmon Survey || — || align=right | 2.8 km || 
|-id=549 bgcolor=#d6d6d6
| 432549 ||  || — || May 3, 2010 || Kitt Peak || Spacewatch || — || align=right | 3.2 km || 
|-id=550 bgcolor=#d6d6d6
| 432550 ||  || — || February 20, 2009 || Mount Lemmon || Mount Lemmon Survey || — || align=right | 3.2 km || 
|-id=551 bgcolor=#d6d6d6
| 432551 ||  || — || May 7, 2010 || Kitt Peak || Spacewatch || — || align=right | 5.4 km || 
|-id=552 bgcolor=#d6d6d6
| 432552 ||  || — || November 19, 2006 || Kitt Peak || Spacewatch || — || align=right | 2.8 km || 
|-id=553 bgcolor=#d6d6d6
| 432553 ||  || — || May 9, 2010 || Mount Lemmon || Mount Lemmon Survey || — || align=right | 3.0 km || 
|-id=554 bgcolor=#d6d6d6
| 432554 ||  || — || February 17, 2010 || WISE || WISE || — || align=right | 4.0 km || 
|-id=555 bgcolor=#d6d6d6
| 432555 ||  || — || November 8, 2008 || Mount Lemmon || Mount Lemmon Survey || — || align=right | 2.3 km || 
|-id=556 bgcolor=#d6d6d6
| 432556 ||  || — || May 2, 2010 || Kitt Peak || Spacewatch || — || align=right | 2.9 km || 
|-id=557 bgcolor=#d6d6d6
| 432557 ||  || — || May 6, 2010 || Kitt Peak || Spacewatch || — || align=right | 3.4 km || 
|-id=558 bgcolor=#d6d6d6
| 432558 ||  || — || February 14, 2010 || WISE || WISE || — || align=right | 3.6 km || 
|-id=559 bgcolor=#d6d6d6
| 432559 ||  || — || May 12, 2010 || Mount Lemmon || Mount Lemmon Survey || — || align=right | 3.4 km || 
|-id=560 bgcolor=#d6d6d6
| 432560 ||  || — || May 7, 2010 || Socorro || LINEAR || — || align=right | 4.0 km || 
|-id=561 bgcolor=#fefefe
| 432561 ||  || — || May 7, 2010 || Socorro || LINEAR || H || align=right data-sort-value="0.77" | 770 m || 
|-id=562 bgcolor=#d6d6d6
| 432562 ||  || — || January 29, 2009 || Mount Lemmon || Mount Lemmon Survey || — || align=right | 2.9 km || 
|-id=563 bgcolor=#d6d6d6
| 432563 ||  || — || May 10, 2010 || WISE || WISE || — || align=right | 4.8 km || 
|-id=564 bgcolor=#d6d6d6
| 432564 ||  || — || August 21, 2006 || Kitt Peak || Spacewatch || — || align=right | 2.9 km || 
|-id=565 bgcolor=#d6d6d6
| 432565 ||  || — || January 25, 2010 || WISE || WISE || — || align=right | 3.4 km || 
|-id=566 bgcolor=#d6d6d6
| 432566 ||  || — || April 26, 2010 || Mount Lemmon || Mount Lemmon Survey || — || align=right | 3.3 km || 
|-id=567 bgcolor=#d6d6d6
| 432567 ||  || — || May 5, 2010 || Mount Lemmon || Mount Lemmon Survey || VER || align=right | 4.2 km || 
|-id=568 bgcolor=#d6d6d6
| 432568 ||  || — || November 14, 2007 || Kitt Peak || Spacewatch || — || align=right | 3.6 km || 
|-id=569 bgcolor=#fefefe
| 432569 ||  || — || June 12, 2010 || Kitt Peak || Spacewatch || H || align=right data-sort-value="0.62" | 620 m || 
|-id=570 bgcolor=#d6d6d6
| 432570 ||  || — || January 20, 2009 || Kitt Peak || Spacewatch || — || align=right | 4.4 km || 
|-id=571 bgcolor=#fefefe
| 432571 ||  || — || July 8, 2010 || WISE || WISE || — || align=right | 1.2 km || 
|-id=572 bgcolor=#d6d6d6
| 432572 ||  || — || January 29, 2010 || WISE || WISE || — || align=right | 3.3 km || 
|-id=573 bgcolor=#d6d6d6
| 432573 ||  || — || July 22, 2010 || WISE || WISE || — || align=right | 5.6 km || 
|-id=574 bgcolor=#d6d6d6
| 432574 ||  || — || May 11, 2005 || Kitt Peak || Spacewatch || — || align=right | 2.9 km || 
|-id=575 bgcolor=#d6d6d6
| 432575 ||  || — || February 2, 2010 || WISE || WISE || — || align=right | 4.6 km || 
|-id=576 bgcolor=#d6d6d6
| 432576 ||  || — || July 24, 2010 || WISE || WISE || — || align=right | 3.6 km || 
|-id=577 bgcolor=#d6d6d6
| 432577 ||  || — || January 30, 2010 || WISE || WISE || — || align=right | 3.7 km || 
|-id=578 bgcolor=#d6d6d6
| 432578 ||  || — || July 25, 2010 || WISE || WISE || — || align=right | 4.4 km || 
|-id=579 bgcolor=#d6d6d6
| 432579 ||  || — || January 31, 2010 || WISE || WISE || — || align=right | 3.8 km || 
|-id=580 bgcolor=#d6d6d6
| 432580 ||  || — || February 2, 2010 || WISE || WISE || Tj (2.97) || align=right | 3.4 km || 
|-id=581 bgcolor=#d6d6d6
| 432581 ||  || — || January 30, 2010 || WISE || WISE || — || align=right | 3.4 km || 
|-id=582 bgcolor=#d6d6d6
| 432582 ||  || — || January 31, 2010 || WISE || WISE || — || align=right | 3.2 km || 
|-id=583 bgcolor=#fefefe
| 432583 ||  || — || August 10, 2010 || Kitt Peak || Spacewatch || — || align=right data-sort-value="0.79" | 790 m || 
|-id=584 bgcolor=#fefefe
| 432584 ||  || — || August 10, 2010 || Kitt Peak || Spacewatch || critical || align=right data-sort-value="0.52" | 520 m || 
|-id=585 bgcolor=#fefefe
| 432585 ||  || — || February 4, 2005 || Kitt Peak || Spacewatch || — || align=right data-sort-value="0.68" | 680 m || 
|-id=586 bgcolor=#fefefe
| 432586 ||  || — || March 8, 2005 || Mount Lemmon || Mount Lemmon Survey || — || align=right data-sort-value="0.97" | 970 m || 
|-id=587 bgcolor=#fefefe
| 432587 ||  || — || November 24, 2003 || Kitt Peak || Spacewatch || — || align=right data-sort-value="0.96" | 960 m || 
|-id=588 bgcolor=#fefefe
| 432588 ||  || — || August 6, 2010 || Kitt Peak || Spacewatch || — || align=right data-sort-value="0.68" | 680 m || 
|-id=589 bgcolor=#FA8072
| 432589 ||  || — || September 10, 2010 || Kitt Peak || Spacewatch || — || align=right data-sort-value="0.47" | 470 m || 
|-id=590 bgcolor=#fefefe
| 432590 ||  || — || September 10, 2010 || Kitt Peak || Spacewatch || — || align=right data-sort-value="0.68" | 680 m || 
|-id=591 bgcolor=#fefefe
| 432591 ||  || — || November 11, 2007 || Mount Lemmon || Mount Lemmon Survey || — || align=right data-sort-value="0.65" | 650 m || 
|-id=592 bgcolor=#fefefe
| 432592 ||  || — || December 20, 2004 || Mount Lemmon || Mount Lemmon Survey || — || align=right data-sort-value="0.56" | 560 m || 
|-id=593 bgcolor=#fefefe
| 432593 ||  || — || September 14, 2010 || Kitt Peak || Spacewatch || — || align=right data-sort-value="0.69" | 690 m || 
|-id=594 bgcolor=#fefefe
| 432594 ||  || — || January 29, 1998 || Kitt Peak || Spacewatch || — || align=right data-sort-value="0.62" | 620 m || 
|-id=595 bgcolor=#fefefe
| 432595 ||  || — || September 11, 2010 || Kitt Peak || Spacewatch || — || align=right data-sort-value="0.71" | 710 m || 
|-id=596 bgcolor=#fefefe
| 432596 ||  || — || September 11, 2010 || Kitt Peak || Spacewatch || — || align=right data-sort-value="0.84" | 840 m || 
|-id=597 bgcolor=#fefefe
| 432597 ||  || — || September 11, 2010 || Kitt Peak || Spacewatch || — || align=right data-sort-value="0.63" | 630 m || 
|-id=598 bgcolor=#fefefe
| 432598 ||  || — || December 17, 2007 || Mount Lemmon || Mount Lemmon Survey || — || align=right data-sort-value="0.55" | 550 m || 
|-id=599 bgcolor=#fefefe
| 432599 ||  || — || March 4, 2008 || Mount Lemmon || Mount Lemmon Survey || — || align=right data-sort-value="0.81" | 810 m || 
|-id=600 bgcolor=#fefefe
| 432600 ||  || — || November 4, 2007 || Mount Lemmon || Mount Lemmon Survey || — || align=right data-sort-value="0.64" | 640 m || 
|}

432601–432700 

|-bgcolor=#fefefe
| 432601 ||  || — || February 3, 2008 || Mount Lemmon || Mount Lemmon Survey || — || align=right data-sort-value="0.74" | 740 m || 
|-id=602 bgcolor=#fefefe
| 432602 ||  || — || September 10, 2010 || Kitt Peak || Spacewatch || — || align=right data-sort-value="0.68" | 680 m || 
|-id=603 bgcolor=#fefefe
| 432603 ||  || — || September 16, 2010 || Kitt Peak || Spacewatch || — || align=right data-sort-value="0.47" | 470 m || 
|-id=604 bgcolor=#fefefe
| 432604 ||  || — || December 18, 2007 || Mount Lemmon || Mount Lemmon Survey || (883)critical || align=right data-sort-value="0.54" | 540 m || 
|-id=605 bgcolor=#fefefe
| 432605 ||  || — || October 13, 2010 || Mount Lemmon || Mount Lemmon Survey || — || align=right data-sort-value="0.70" | 700 m || 
|-id=606 bgcolor=#fefefe
| 432606 ||  || — || September 16, 2010 || Kitt Peak || Spacewatch || — || align=right data-sort-value="0.62" | 620 m || 
|-id=607 bgcolor=#fefefe
| 432607 ||  || — || November 3, 2007 || Mount Lemmon || Mount Lemmon Survey || — || align=right data-sort-value="0.58" | 580 m || 
|-id=608 bgcolor=#fefefe
| 432608 ||  || — || October 17, 2010 || Mount Lemmon || Mount Lemmon Survey || — || align=right data-sort-value="0.98" | 980 m || 
|-id=609 bgcolor=#fefefe
| 432609 ||  || — || December 31, 2007 || Mount Lemmon || Mount Lemmon Survey || — || align=right data-sort-value="0.60" | 600 m || 
|-id=610 bgcolor=#fefefe
| 432610 ||  || — || September 18, 2010 || Mount Lemmon || Mount Lemmon Survey || — || align=right data-sort-value="0.80" | 800 m || 
|-id=611 bgcolor=#C2FFFF
| 432611 ||  || — || October 1, 2009 || Mount Lemmon || Mount Lemmon Survey || L4 || align=right | 15 km || 
|-id=612 bgcolor=#fefefe
| 432612 ||  || — || October 11, 2010 || Catalina || CSS || — || align=right data-sort-value="0.66" | 660 m || 
|-id=613 bgcolor=#fefefe
| 432613 ||  || — || January 12, 2008 || Mount Lemmon || Mount Lemmon Survey || — || align=right data-sort-value="0.68" | 680 m || 
|-id=614 bgcolor=#fefefe
| 432614 ||  || — || November 19, 2003 || Kitt Peak || Spacewatch || — || align=right data-sort-value="0.63" | 630 m || 
|-id=615 bgcolor=#C2FFFF
| 432615 ||  || — || October 30, 2010 || Mount Lemmon || Mount Lemmon Survey || L4 || align=right | 6.8 km || 
|-id=616 bgcolor=#FA8072
| 432616 ||  || — || October 1, 2003 || Anderson Mesa || LONEOS || — || align=right data-sort-value="0.95" | 950 m || 
|-id=617 bgcolor=#C2FFFF
| 432617 ||  || — || October 28, 2010 || Mount Lemmon || Mount Lemmon Survey || L4 || align=right | 9.4 km || 
|-id=618 bgcolor=#fefefe
| 432618 ||  || — || November 7, 2007 || Mount Lemmon || Mount Lemmon Survey || — || align=right data-sort-value="0.69" | 690 m || 
|-id=619 bgcolor=#fefefe
| 432619 ||  || — || February 9, 2008 || Kitt Peak || Spacewatch || — || align=right data-sort-value="0.69" | 690 m || 
|-id=620 bgcolor=#fefefe
| 432620 ||  || — || November 2, 2007 || Mount Lemmon || Mount Lemmon Survey || — || align=right data-sort-value="0.84" | 840 m || 
|-id=621 bgcolor=#fefefe
| 432621 ||  || — || November 18, 2000 || Kitt Peak || Spacewatch || — || align=right data-sort-value="0.54" | 540 m || 
|-id=622 bgcolor=#fefefe
| 432622 ||  || — || December 19, 2003 || Socorro || LINEAR || — || align=right data-sort-value="0.92" | 920 m || 
|-id=623 bgcolor=#fefefe
| 432623 ||  || — || November 20, 2007 || Mount Lemmon || Mount Lemmon Survey || — || align=right data-sort-value="0.76" | 760 m || 
|-id=624 bgcolor=#fefefe
| 432624 ||  || — || September 15, 2006 || Kitt Peak || Spacewatch || — || align=right data-sort-value="0.60" | 600 m || 
|-id=625 bgcolor=#C2FFFF
| 432625 ||  || — || October 17, 2009 || Mount Lemmon || Mount Lemmon Survey || L4 || align=right | 8.2 km || 
|-id=626 bgcolor=#fefefe
| 432626 ||  || — || August 27, 2006 || Kitt Peak || Spacewatch || MAS || align=right data-sort-value="0.74" | 740 m || 
|-id=627 bgcolor=#fefefe
| 432627 ||  || — || October 28, 2010 || Kitt Peak || Spacewatch || — || align=right data-sort-value="0.71" | 710 m || 
|-id=628 bgcolor=#fefefe
| 432628 ||  || — || November 6, 2010 || Kitt Peak || Spacewatch || — || align=right data-sort-value="0.74" | 740 m || 
|-id=629 bgcolor=#C2FFFF
| 432629 ||  || — || September 28, 2009 || Mount Lemmon || Mount Lemmon Survey || L4 || align=right | 7.8 km || 
|-id=630 bgcolor=#fefefe
| 432630 ||  || — || September 5, 2010 || Mount Lemmon || Mount Lemmon Survey || — || align=right data-sort-value="0.82" | 820 m || 
|-id=631 bgcolor=#fefefe
| 432631 ||  || — || October 29, 2010 || Mount Lemmon || Mount Lemmon Survey || — || align=right data-sort-value="0.62" | 620 m || 
|-id=632 bgcolor=#fefefe
| 432632 ||  || — || August 21, 2006 || Kitt Peak || Spacewatch || NYS || align=right data-sort-value="0.51" | 510 m || 
|-id=633 bgcolor=#fefefe
| 432633 ||  || — || September 10, 2010 || Kitt Peak || Spacewatch || — || align=right data-sort-value="0.54" | 540 m || 
|-id=634 bgcolor=#fefefe
| 432634 ||  || — || March 28, 2008 || Mount Lemmon || Mount Lemmon Survey || MAS || align=right data-sort-value="0.52" | 520 m || 
|-id=635 bgcolor=#fefefe
| 432635 ||  || — || October 2, 2003 || Kitt Peak || Spacewatch || — || align=right data-sort-value="0.65" | 650 m || 
|-id=636 bgcolor=#C2FFFF
| 432636 ||  || — || September 29, 2009 || Kitt Peak || Spacewatch || L4 || align=right | 8.9 km || 
|-id=637 bgcolor=#C2FFFF
| 432637 ||  || — || December 15, 1998 || Kitt Peak || Spacewatch || L4 || align=right | 12 km || 
|-id=638 bgcolor=#fefefe
| 432638 ||  || — || September 5, 1999 || Kitt Peak || Spacewatch || — || align=right data-sort-value="0.57" | 570 m || 
|-id=639 bgcolor=#C2FFFF
| 432639 ||  || — || September 15, 2009 || Kitt Peak || Spacewatch || L4 || align=right | 7.9 km || 
|-id=640 bgcolor=#fefefe
| 432640 ||  || — || November 13, 2010 || Mount Lemmon || Mount Lemmon Survey || V || align=right data-sort-value="0.44" | 440 m || 
|-id=641 bgcolor=#fefefe
| 432641 ||  || — || October 31, 2010 || Mount Lemmon || Mount Lemmon Survey || — || align=right data-sort-value="0.64" | 640 m || 
|-id=642 bgcolor=#fefefe
| 432642 ||  || — || October 21, 2003 || Kitt Peak || Spacewatch || — || align=right data-sort-value="0.44" | 440 m || 
|-id=643 bgcolor=#fefefe
| 432643 ||  || — || October 21, 1995 || Kitt Peak || Spacewatch || — || align=right data-sort-value="0.51" | 510 m || 
|-id=644 bgcolor=#fefefe
| 432644 ||  || — || May 19, 2006 || Mount Lemmon || Mount Lemmon Survey || — || align=right data-sort-value="0.64" | 640 m || 
|-id=645 bgcolor=#fefefe
| 432645 ||  || — || March 7, 2008 || Kitt Peak || Spacewatch || — || align=right data-sort-value="0.49" | 490 m || 
|-id=646 bgcolor=#fefefe
| 432646 ||  || — || November 13, 2010 || Kitt Peak || Spacewatch || — || align=right data-sort-value="0.78" | 780 m || 
|-id=647 bgcolor=#fefefe
| 432647 ||  || — || November 27, 2010 || Mount Lemmon || Mount Lemmon Survey || — || align=right data-sort-value="0.61" | 610 m || 
|-id=648 bgcolor=#fefefe
| 432648 ||  || — || February 28, 2008 || Kitt Peak || Spacewatch || — || align=right data-sort-value="0.55" | 550 m || 
|-id=649 bgcolor=#fefefe
| 432649 ||  || — || December 18, 2003 || Socorro || LINEAR || — || align=right data-sort-value="0.75" | 750 m || 
|-id=650 bgcolor=#C2FFFF
| 432650 ||  || — || May 15, 2005 || Mount Lemmon || Mount Lemmon Survey || L4 || align=right | 11 km || 
|-id=651 bgcolor=#fefefe
| 432651 ||  || — || December 2, 2010 || Mount Lemmon || Mount Lemmon Survey || — || align=right data-sort-value="0.61" | 610 m || 
|-id=652 bgcolor=#C2FFFF
| 432652 ||  || — || November 1, 2010 || Mount Lemmon || Mount Lemmon Survey || L4 || align=right | 8.1 km || 
|-id=653 bgcolor=#fefefe
| 432653 ||  || — || October 21, 2003 || Kitt Peak || Spacewatch || — || align=right data-sort-value="0.62" | 620 m || 
|-id=654 bgcolor=#fefefe
| 432654 ||  || — || November 5, 2010 || Kitt Peak || Spacewatch || — || align=right data-sort-value="0.62" | 620 m || 
|-id=655 bgcolor=#FFC2E0
| 432655 ||  || — || December 14, 2010 || Mount Lemmon || Mount Lemmon Survey || AMO || align=right data-sort-value="0.41" | 410 m || 
|-id=656 bgcolor=#fefefe
| 432656 ||  || — || October 30, 2010 || Kitt Peak || Spacewatch || — || align=right data-sort-value="0.57" | 570 m || 
|-id=657 bgcolor=#fefefe
| 432657 ||  || — || September 18, 2006 || Kitt Peak || Spacewatch || — || align=right data-sort-value="0.59" | 590 m || 
|-id=658 bgcolor=#fefefe
| 432658 ||  || — || December 17, 2003 || Kitt Peak || Spacewatch || V || align=right data-sort-value="0.61" | 610 m || 
|-id=659 bgcolor=#fefefe
| 432659 ||  || — || October 18, 2006 || Kitt Peak || Spacewatch || NYS || align=right data-sort-value="0.58" | 580 m || 
|-id=660 bgcolor=#fefefe
| 432660 ||  || — || November 11, 2010 || Mount Lemmon || Mount Lemmon Survey || V || align=right data-sort-value="0.68" | 680 m || 
|-id=661 bgcolor=#fefefe
| 432661 ||  || — || November 11, 2006 || Kitt Peak || Spacewatch || — || align=right data-sort-value="0.83" | 830 m || 
|-id=662 bgcolor=#fefefe
| 432662 ||  || — || January 13, 2004 || Anderson Mesa || LONEOS || — || align=right data-sort-value="0.82" | 820 m || 
|-id=663 bgcolor=#fefefe
| 432663 ||  || — || April 29, 2008 || Mount Lemmon || Mount Lemmon Survey || — || align=right data-sort-value="0.74" | 740 m || 
|-id=664 bgcolor=#fefefe
| 432664 ||  || — || January 9, 2011 || Kitt Peak || Spacewatch || critical || align=right data-sort-value="0.75" | 750 m || 
|-id=665 bgcolor=#fefefe
| 432665 ||  || — || April 5, 2008 || Mount Lemmon || Mount Lemmon Survey || NYS || align=right data-sort-value="0.72" | 720 m || 
|-id=666 bgcolor=#fefefe
| 432666 ||  || — || January 8, 2011 || Mount Lemmon || Mount Lemmon Survey || — || align=right data-sort-value="0.73" | 730 m || 
|-id=667 bgcolor=#fefefe
| 432667 ||  || — || December 15, 2006 || Kitt Peak || Spacewatch || — || align=right data-sort-value="0.75" | 750 m || 
|-id=668 bgcolor=#fefefe
| 432668 ||  || — || October 2, 2006 || Mount Lemmon || Mount Lemmon Survey || — || align=right data-sort-value="0.83" | 830 m || 
|-id=669 bgcolor=#fefefe
| 432669 ||  || — || August 27, 2009 || Kitt Peak || Spacewatch || — || align=right data-sort-value="0.71" | 710 m || 
|-id=670 bgcolor=#fefefe
| 432670 ||  || — || December 16, 2006 || Kitt Peak || Spacewatch || MAS || align=right data-sort-value="0.54" | 540 m || 
|-id=671 bgcolor=#fefefe
| 432671 ||  || — || March 29, 2004 || Kitt Peak || Spacewatch || NYS || align=right data-sort-value="0.58" | 580 m || 
|-id=672 bgcolor=#fefefe
| 432672 ||  || — || January 27, 2000 || Kitt Peak || Spacewatch || NYS || align=right data-sort-value="0.49" | 490 m || 
|-id=673 bgcolor=#fefefe
| 432673 ||  || — || November 1, 2006 || Mount Lemmon || Mount Lemmon Survey || NYS || align=right data-sort-value="0.59" | 590 m || 
|-id=674 bgcolor=#fefefe
| 432674 ||  || — || March 20, 2004 || Kitt Peak || Spacewatch || — || align=right data-sort-value="0.65" | 650 m || 
|-id=675 bgcolor=#fefefe
| 432675 ||  || — || November 22, 2006 || Catalina || CSS || — || align=right data-sort-value="0.77" | 770 m || 
|-id=676 bgcolor=#fefefe
| 432676 ||  || — || October 27, 2006 || Mount Lemmon || Mount Lemmon Survey || — || align=right data-sort-value="0.66" | 660 m || 
|-id=677 bgcolor=#fefefe
| 432677 ||  || — || April 14, 2004 || Kitt Peak || Spacewatch || — || align=right data-sort-value="0.81" | 810 m || 
|-id=678 bgcolor=#E9E9E9
| 432678 ||  || — || October 27, 2005 || Mount Lemmon || Mount Lemmon Survey || — || align=right | 1.1 km || 
|-id=679 bgcolor=#fefefe
| 432679 ||  || — || January 9, 2011 || Mount Lemmon || Mount Lemmon Survey || MAS || align=right data-sort-value="0.68" | 680 m || 
|-id=680 bgcolor=#fefefe
| 432680 ||  || — || September 26, 2006 || Kitt Peak || Spacewatch || — || align=right data-sort-value="0.59" | 590 m || 
|-id=681 bgcolor=#fefefe
| 432681 ||  || — || November 23, 2006 || Kitt Peak || Spacewatch || NYS || align=right data-sort-value="0.55" | 550 m || 
|-id=682 bgcolor=#E9E9E9
| 432682 ||  || — || October 27, 2005 || Catalina || CSS || JUN || align=right data-sort-value="0.97" | 970 m || 
|-id=683 bgcolor=#E9E9E9
| 432683 ||  || — || February 21, 2007 || Kitt Peak || Spacewatch || — || align=right data-sort-value="0.68" | 680 m || 
|-id=684 bgcolor=#fefefe
| 432684 ||  || — || October 27, 1994 || Kitt Peak || Spacewatch || — || align=right data-sort-value="0.82" | 820 m || 
|-id=685 bgcolor=#fefefe
| 432685 ||  || — || April 21, 2004 || Campo Imperatore || CINEOS || — || align=right data-sort-value="0.79" | 790 m || 
|-id=686 bgcolor=#E9E9E9
| 432686 ||  || — || January 17, 2007 || Kitt Peak || Spacewatch || — || align=right data-sort-value="0.77" | 770 m || 
|-id=687 bgcolor=#fefefe
| 432687 ||  || — || December 21, 2006 || Kitt Peak || Spacewatch || — || align=right | 1.0 km || 
|-id=688 bgcolor=#fefefe
| 432688 ||  || — || December 15, 2006 || Kitt Peak || Spacewatch || MAS || align=right data-sort-value="0.66" | 660 m || 
|-id=689 bgcolor=#fefefe
| 432689 ||  || — || April 28, 2008 || Mount Lemmon || Mount Lemmon Survey || — || align=right data-sort-value="0.87" | 870 m || 
|-id=690 bgcolor=#E9E9E9
| 432690 ||  || — || February 22, 2007 || Kitt Peak || Spacewatch || — || align=right | 1.1 km || 
|-id=691 bgcolor=#d6d6d6
| 432691 ||  || — || July 18, 2007 || Mount Lemmon || Mount Lemmon Survey || — || align=right | 3.3 km || 
|-id=692 bgcolor=#fefefe
| 432692 ||  || — || November 28, 2006 || Kitt Peak || Spacewatch || NYS || align=right data-sort-value="0.67" | 670 m || 
|-id=693 bgcolor=#fefefe
| 432693 ||  || — || November 28, 2006 || Mount Lemmon || Mount Lemmon Survey || — || align=right data-sort-value="0.83" | 830 m || 
|-id=694 bgcolor=#fefefe
| 432694 ||  || — || January 28, 2011 || Mount Lemmon || Mount Lemmon Survey || — || align=right data-sort-value="0.94" | 940 m || 
|-id=695 bgcolor=#fefefe
| 432695 ||  || — || January 10, 2011 || Mount Lemmon || Mount Lemmon Survey || NYS || align=right data-sort-value="0.60" | 600 m || 
|-id=696 bgcolor=#fefefe
| 432696 ||  || — || January 9, 2011 || Mount Lemmon || Mount Lemmon Survey || — || align=right data-sort-value="0.75" | 750 m || 
|-id=697 bgcolor=#fefefe
| 432697 ||  || — || October 2, 2006 || Mount Lemmon || Mount Lemmon Survey || — || align=right data-sort-value="0.57" | 570 m || 
|-id=698 bgcolor=#fefefe
| 432698 ||  || — || January 15, 2011 || Mount Lemmon || Mount Lemmon Survey || — || align=right data-sort-value="0.72" | 720 m || 
|-id=699 bgcolor=#fefefe
| 432699 ||  || — || April 3, 2008 || Kitt Peak || Spacewatch || — || align=right data-sort-value="0.86" | 860 m || 
|-id=700 bgcolor=#fefefe
| 432700 ||  || — || February 4, 2000 || Kitt Peak || Spacewatch || — || align=right data-sort-value="0.96" | 960 m || 
|}

432701–432800 

|-bgcolor=#fefefe
| 432701 ||  || — || July 16, 2005 || Kitt Peak || Spacewatch || — || align=right | 1.0 km || 
|-id=702 bgcolor=#fefefe
| 432702 ||  || — || April 13, 2004 || Kitt Peak || Spacewatch || — || align=right data-sort-value="0.90" | 900 m || 
|-id=703 bgcolor=#fefefe
| 432703 ||  || — || December 10, 2010 || Mount Lemmon || Mount Lemmon Survey || — || align=right | 1.0 km || 
|-id=704 bgcolor=#fefefe
| 432704 ||  || — || September 21, 2009 || Kitt Peak || Spacewatch || — || align=right data-sort-value="0.89" | 890 m || 
|-id=705 bgcolor=#fefefe
| 432705 ||  || — || April 20, 2004 || Socorro || LINEAR || — || align=right data-sort-value="0.90" | 900 m || 
|-id=706 bgcolor=#fefefe
| 432706 ||  || — || December 10, 2006 || Kitt Peak || Spacewatch || — || align=right data-sort-value="0.63" | 630 m || 
|-id=707 bgcolor=#fefefe
| 432707 ||  || — || July 2, 2005 || Kitt Peak || Spacewatch || — || align=right data-sort-value="0.97" | 970 m || 
|-id=708 bgcolor=#fefefe
| 432708 ||  || — || February 29, 2000 || Socorro || LINEAR || — || align=right data-sort-value="0.88" | 880 m || 
|-id=709 bgcolor=#fefefe
| 432709 ||  || — || April 27, 2008 || Kitt Peak || Spacewatch || V || align=right data-sort-value="0.65" | 650 m || 
|-id=710 bgcolor=#fefefe
| 432710 ||  || — || March 18, 2004 || Socorro || LINEAR || — || align=right data-sort-value="0.93" | 930 m || 
|-id=711 bgcolor=#fefefe
| 432711 ||  || — || November 17, 2006 || Kitt Peak || Spacewatch || NYS || align=right data-sort-value="0.58" | 580 m || 
|-id=712 bgcolor=#fefefe
| 432712 ||  || — || April 16, 2004 || Socorro || LINEAR || critical || align=right data-sort-value="0.75" | 750 m || 
|-id=713 bgcolor=#fefefe
| 432713 ||  || — || April 5, 2000 || Socorro || LINEAR || — || align=right data-sort-value="0.76" | 760 m || 
|-id=714 bgcolor=#fefefe
| 432714 ||  || — || December 9, 2010 || Mount Lemmon || Mount Lemmon Survey || NYS || align=right data-sort-value="0.52" | 520 m || 
|-id=715 bgcolor=#fefefe
| 432715 ||  || — || January 11, 2011 || Kitt Peak || Spacewatch || V || align=right data-sort-value="0.64" | 640 m || 
|-id=716 bgcolor=#fefefe
| 432716 ||  || — || May 9, 2004 || Kitt Peak || Spacewatch || — || align=right data-sort-value="0.62" | 620 m || 
|-id=717 bgcolor=#fefefe
| 432717 ||  || — || February 17, 2004 || Kitt Peak || Spacewatch || — || align=right data-sort-value="0.75" | 750 m || 
|-id=718 bgcolor=#E9E9E9
| 432718 ||  || — || February 21, 2007 || Kitt Peak || Spacewatch || — || align=right data-sort-value="0.62" | 620 m || 
|-id=719 bgcolor=#fefefe
| 432719 ||  || — || January 26, 2011 || Kitt Peak || Spacewatch || NYS || align=right data-sort-value="0.70" | 700 m || 
|-id=720 bgcolor=#fefefe
| 432720 ||  || — || May 1, 2008 || Kitt Peak || Spacewatch || — || align=right data-sort-value="0.74" | 740 m || 
|-id=721 bgcolor=#E9E9E9
| 432721 ||  || — || January 28, 2007 || Mount Lemmon || Mount Lemmon Survey || — || align=right data-sort-value="0.64" | 640 m || 
|-id=722 bgcolor=#fefefe
| 432722 ||  || — || January 26, 2000 || Kitt Peak || Spacewatch || V || align=right data-sort-value="0.63" | 630 m || 
|-id=723 bgcolor=#d6d6d6
| 432723 ||  || — || February 1, 2006 || Kitt Peak || Spacewatch || KOR || align=right | 1.2 km || 
|-id=724 bgcolor=#E9E9E9
| 432724 ||  || — || March 13, 2007 || Mount Lemmon || Mount Lemmon Survey || — || align=right data-sort-value="0.82" | 820 m || 
|-id=725 bgcolor=#E9E9E9
| 432725 ||  || — || August 22, 2004 || Kitt Peak || Spacewatch || — || align=right | 1.6 km || 
|-id=726 bgcolor=#fefefe
| 432726 ||  || — || January 8, 2011 || Mount Lemmon || Mount Lemmon Survey || — || align=right | 1.2 km || 
|-id=727 bgcolor=#fefefe
| 432727 ||  || — || January 9, 2007 || Kitt Peak || Spacewatch || SUL || align=right | 1.7 km || 
|-id=728 bgcolor=#E9E9E9
| 432728 ||  || — || October 25, 2009 || Mount Lemmon || Mount Lemmon Survey || — || align=right | 1.2 km || 
|-id=729 bgcolor=#fefefe
| 432729 ||  || — || December 12, 2006 || Socorro || LINEAR || — || align=right | 1.1 km || 
|-id=730 bgcolor=#fefefe
| 432730 ||  || — || February 5, 2000 || Kitt Peak || Spacewatch || critical || align=right data-sort-value="0.59" | 590 m || 
|-id=731 bgcolor=#fefefe
| 432731 ||  || — || February 8, 2000 || Kitt Peak || Spacewatch || — || align=right data-sort-value="0.71" | 710 m || 
|-id=732 bgcolor=#fefefe
| 432732 ||  || — || September 14, 2005 || Kitt Peak || Spacewatch || — || align=right data-sort-value="0.94" | 940 m || 
|-id=733 bgcolor=#E9E9E9
| 432733 ||  || — || February 26, 2011 || Kitt Peak || Spacewatch || EUN || align=right | 1.2 km || 
|-id=734 bgcolor=#fefefe
| 432734 ||  || — || February 26, 2011 || Kitt Peak || Spacewatch || — || align=right data-sort-value="0.78" | 780 m || 
|-id=735 bgcolor=#fefefe
| 432735 ||  || — || November 28, 2005 || Kitt Peak || Spacewatch || — || align=right data-sort-value="0.99" | 990 m || 
|-id=736 bgcolor=#E9E9E9
| 432736 ||  || — || January 8, 2011 || Mount Lemmon || Mount Lemmon Survey || — || align=right | 1.9 km || 
|-id=737 bgcolor=#fefefe
| 432737 ||  || — || September 17, 2006 || Kitt Peak || Spacewatch || — || align=right data-sort-value="0.70" | 700 m || 
|-id=738 bgcolor=#fefefe
| 432738 ||  || — || November 21, 2005 || Kitt Peak || Spacewatch || NYS || align=right data-sort-value="0.77" | 770 m || 
|-id=739 bgcolor=#fefefe
| 432739 ||  || — || October 7, 2005 || Kitt Peak || Spacewatch || — || align=right data-sort-value="0.66" | 660 m || 
|-id=740 bgcolor=#fefefe
| 432740 ||  || — || October 22, 2005 || Kitt Peak || Spacewatch || V || align=right data-sort-value="0.68" | 680 m || 
|-id=741 bgcolor=#E9E9E9
| 432741 ||  || — || February 26, 2011 || Kitt Peak || Spacewatch || (5) || align=right data-sort-value="0.70" | 700 m || 
|-id=742 bgcolor=#fefefe
| 432742 ||  || — || May 9, 2004 || Kitt Peak || Spacewatch || MAS || align=right data-sort-value="0.57" | 570 m || 
|-id=743 bgcolor=#fefefe
| 432743 ||  || — || September 25, 2005 || Kitt Peak || Spacewatch || — || align=right data-sort-value="0.78" | 780 m || 
|-id=744 bgcolor=#fefefe
| 432744 ||  || — || January 29, 2007 || Kitt Peak || Spacewatch || NYS || align=right data-sort-value="0.57" | 570 m || 
|-id=745 bgcolor=#fefefe
| 432745 ||  || — || February 23, 2011 || Kitt Peak || Spacewatch || — || align=right data-sort-value="0.80" | 800 m || 
|-id=746 bgcolor=#fefefe
| 432746 ||  || — || February 8, 2007 || Kitt Peak || Spacewatch || MAS || align=right data-sort-value="0.67" | 670 m || 
|-id=747 bgcolor=#E9E9E9
| 432747 ||  || — || March 9, 2007 || Kitt Peak || Spacewatch || MAR || align=right data-sort-value="0.96" | 960 m || 
|-id=748 bgcolor=#fefefe
| 432748 ||  || — || January 17, 2007 || Kitt Peak || Spacewatch || NYS || align=right data-sort-value="0.58" | 580 m || 
|-id=749 bgcolor=#fefefe
| 432749 ||  || — || September 30, 2005 || Mount Lemmon || Mount Lemmon Survey || — || align=right | 1.00 km || 
|-id=750 bgcolor=#E9E9E9
| 432750 ||  || — || February 10, 2011 || Catalina || CSS || — || align=right | 2.2 km || 
|-id=751 bgcolor=#E9E9E9
| 432751 ||  || — || March 14, 2007 || Mount Lemmon || Mount Lemmon Survey || — || align=right | 1.8 km || 
|-id=752 bgcolor=#E9E9E9
| 432752 ||  || — || January 30, 2011 || Kitt Peak || Spacewatch || — || align=right | 1.2 km || 
|-id=753 bgcolor=#fefefe
| 432753 ||  || — || November 18, 2006 || Mount Lemmon || Mount Lemmon Survey || — || align=right data-sort-value="0.81" | 810 m || 
|-id=754 bgcolor=#E9E9E9
| 432754 ||  || — || September 17, 2009 || Kitt Peak || Spacewatch || — || align=right data-sort-value="0.77" | 770 m || 
|-id=755 bgcolor=#E9E9E9
| 432755 ||  || — || September 4, 2008 || Kitt Peak || Spacewatch || — || align=right | 1.7 km || 
|-id=756 bgcolor=#E9E9E9
| 432756 ||  || — || January 18, 2010 || WISE || WISE || — || align=right | 1.7 km || 
|-id=757 bgcolor=#fefefe
| 432757 ||  || — || February 8, 2007 || Kitt Peak || Spacewatch || — || align=right data-sort-value="0.70" | 700 m || 
|-id=758 bgcolor=#fefefe
| 432758 ||  || — || January 29, 2007 || Kitt Peak || Spacewatch || — || align=right data-sort-value="0.82" | 820 m || 
|-id=759 bgcolor=#fefefe
| 432759 ||  || — || February 16, 2007 || Catalina || CSS || — || align=right | 1.1 km || 
|-id=760 bgcolor=#E9E9E9
| 432760 ||  || — || February 26, 2007 || Mount Lemmon || Mount Lemmon Survey || — || align=right data-sort-value="0.99" | 990 m || 
|-id=761 bgcolor=#E9E9E9
| 432761 ||  || — || October 7, 2008 || Mount Lemmon || Mount Lemmon Survey || — || align=right | 1.3 km || 
|-id=762 bgcolor=#E9E9E9
| 432762 ||  || — || September 22, 2008 || Kitt Peak || Spacewatch || — || align=right | 1.5 km || 
|-id=763 bgcolor=#fefefe
| 432763 ||  || — || October 7, 2005 || Kitt Peak || Spacewatch || — || align=right | 1.1 km || 
|-id=764 bgcolor=#E9E9E9
| 432764 ||  || — || March 2, 2011 || Kitt Peak || Spacewatch || — || align=right | 1.3 km || 
|-id=765 bgcolor=#fefefe
| 432765 ||  || — || September 23, 2008 || Mount Lemmon || Mount Lemmon Survey || — || align=right data-sort-value="0.73" | 730 m || 
|-id=766 bgcolor=#fefefe
| 432766 ||  || — || January 28, 2007 || Mount Lemmon || Mount Lemmon Survey || — || align=right data-sort-value="0.90" | 900 m || 
|-id=767 bgcolor=#fefefe
| 432767 ||  || — || January 27, 2007 || Kitt Peak || Spacewatch || — || align=right data-sort-value="0.89" | 890 m || 
|-id=768 bgcolor=#E9E9E9
| 432768 ||  || — || September 6, 2008 || Kitt Peak || Spacewatch || — || align=right | 2.0 km || 
|-id=769 bgcolor=#E9E9E9
| 432769 ||  || — || October 8, 2008 || Kitt Peak || Spacewatch || — || align=right | 1.9 km || 
|-id=770 bgcolor=#E9E9E9
| 432770 ||  || — || February 2, 2006 || Kitt Peak || Spacewatch || — || align=right | 1.9 km || 
|-id=771 bgcolor=#E9E9E9
| 432771 ||  || — || January 15, 2011 || Mount Lemmon || Mount Lemmon Survey || — || align=right | 2.1 km || 
|-id=772 bgcolor=#E9E9E9
| 432772 ||  || — || September 4, 2008 || Kitt Peak || Spacewatch || — || align=right | 2.2 km || 
|-id=773 bgcolor=#E9E9E9
| 432773 ||  || — || February 25, 2011 || Kitt Peak || Spacewatch || — || align=right data-sort-value="0.71" | 710 m || 
|-id=774 bgcolor=#E9E9E9
| 432774 ||  || — || December 30, 2005 || Catalina || CSS || — || align=right | 1.8 km || 
|-id=775 bgcolor=#E9E9E9
| 432775 ||  || — || September 26, 2008 || Kitt Peak || Spacewatch || — || align=right | 1.2 km || 
|-id=776 bgcolor=#E9E9E9
| 432776 ||  || — || May 7, 2007 || Kitt Peak || Spacewatch || — || align=right | 1.2 km || 
|-id=777 bgcolor=#E9E9E9
| 432777 ||  || — || February 11, 2011 || Mount Lemmon || Mount Lemmon Survey || — || align=right data-sort-value="0.67" | 670 m || 
|-id=778 bgcolor=#E9E9E9
| 432778 ||  || — || October 10, 1999 || Socorro || LINEAR || — || align=right | 2.1 km || 
|-id=779 bgcolor=#fefefe
| 432779 ||  || — || February 17, 2007 || Kitt Peak || Spacewatch || — || align=right data-sort-value="0.75" | 750 m || 
|-id=780 bgcolor=#E9E9E9
| 432780 ||  || — || October 5, 2004 || Kitt Peak || Spacewatch || — || align=right | 1.6 km || 
|-id=781 bgcolor=#E9E9E9
| 432781 ||  || — || December 1, 2005 || Kitt Peak || Spacewatch || — || align=right | 1.3 km || 
|-id=782 bgcolor=#E9E9E9
| 432782 ||  || — || March 13, 2007 || Kitt Peak || Spacewatch || — || align=right data-sort-value="0.80" | 800 m || 
|-id=783 bgcolor=#fefefe
| 432783 ||  || — || March 10, 2007 || Kitt Peak || Spacewatch || — || align=right data-sort-value="0.73" | 730 m || 
|-id=784 bgcolor=#E9E9E9
| 432784 ||  || — || March 14, 2007 || Kitt Peak || Spacewatch || — || align=right data-sort-value="0.84" | 840 m || 
|-id=785 bgcolor=#E9E9E9
| 432785 ||  || — || December 29, 2005 || Kitt Peak || Spacewatch || — || align=right | 2.0 km || 
|-id=786 bgcolor=#E9E9E9
| 432786 ||  || — || April 14, 2007 || Kitt Peak || Spacewatch || — || align=right data-sort-value="0.78" | 780 m || 
|-id=787 bgcolor=#E9E9E9
| 432787 ||  || — || April 24, 2007 || Mount Lemmon || Mount Lemmon Survey || — || align=right | 1.6 km || 
|-id=788 bgcolor=#E9E9E9
| 432788 ||  || — || April 11, 2007 || Kitt Peak || Spacewatch || — || align=right data-sort-value="0.96" | 960 m || 
|-id=789 bgcolor=#E9E9E9
| 432789 ||  || — || May 9, 2007 || Mount Lemmon || Mount Lemmon Survey || ADE || align=right | 1.4 km || 
|-id=790 bgcolor=#fefefe
| 432790 ||  || — || March 1, 2011 || Mount Lemmon || Mount Lemmon Survey || MAS || align=right data-sort-value="0.71" | 710 m || 
|-id=791 bgcolor=#fefefe
| 432791 ||  || — || March 10, 2007 || Kitt Peak || Spacewatch || NYS || align=right data-sort-value="0.72" | 720 m || 
|-id=792 bgcolor=#E9E9E9
| 432792 ||  || — || February 13, 2011 || Kitt Peak || Spacewatch || — || align=right | 2.6 km || 
|-id=793 bgcolor=#E9E9E9
| 432793 ||  || — || March 15, 2007 || Mount Lemmon || Mount Lemmon Survey || — || align=right | 1.4 km || 
|-id=794 bgcolor=#E9E9E9
| 432794 ||  || — || March 11, 2011 || Kitt Peak || Spacewatch || — || align=right | 1.9 km || 
|-id=795 bgcolor=#E9E9E9
| 432795 ||  || — || November 19, 2009 || Kitt Peak || Spacewatch || — || align=right | 1.3 km || 
|-id=796 bgcolor=#E9E9E9
| 432796 ||  || — || October 26, 2009 || Kitt Peak || Spacewatch || — || align=right | 2.0 km || 
|-id=797 bgcolor=#E9E9E9
| 432797 ||  || — || October 6, 2008 || Kitt Peak || Spacewatch || — || align=right | 1.8 km || 
|-id=798 bgcolor=#fefefe
| 432798 ||  || — || December 1, 2005 || Mount Lemmon || Mount Lemmon Survey || — || align=right | 1.0 km || 
|-id=799 bgcolor=#E9E9E9
| 432799 ||  || — || March 15, 2010 || WISE || WISE || — || align=right | 3.3 km || 
|-id=800 bgcolor=#E9E9E9
| 432800 ||  || — || March 11, 2011 || Mount Lemmon || Mount Lemmon Survey || — || align=right | 2.6 km || 
|}

432801–432900 

|-bgcolor=#fefefe
| 432801 ||  || — || November 6, 2005 || Kitt Peak || Spacewatch || — || align=right | 1.00 km || 
|-id=802 bgcolor=#E9E9E9
| 432802 ||  || — || February 8, 2011 || Mount Lemmon || Mount Lemmon Survey || — || align=right | 2.2 km || 
|-id=803 bgcolor=#E9E9E9
| 432803 ||  || — || October 14, 2009 || Mount Lemmon || Mount Lemmon Survey || — || align=right | 2.5 km || 
|-id=804 bgcolor=#E9E9E9
| 432804 ||  || — || November 21, 2005 || Kitt Peak || Spacewatch || — || align=right | 1.5 km || 
|-id=805 bgcolor=#E9E9E9
| 432805 ||  || — || October 4, 2004 || Kitt Peak || Spacewatch || — || align=right | 1.7 km || 
|-id=806 bgcolor=#E9E9E9
| 432806 ||  || — || April 1, 2011 || Mount Lemmon || Mount Lemmon Survey || — || align=right | 1.8 km || 
|-id=807 bgcolor=#E9E9E9
| 432807 ||  || — || February 1, 2010 || WISE || WISE || — || align=right | 2.6 km || 
|-id=808 bgcolor=#E9E9E9
| 432808 ||  || — || March 15, 2007 || Kitt Peak || Spacewatch || — || align=right | 1.5 km || 
|-id=809 bgcolor=#E9E9E9
| 432809 ||  || — || April 6, 2011 || Mount Lemmon || Mount Lemmon Survey || — || align=right | 1.1 km || 
|-id=810 bgcolor=#E9E9E9
| 432810 ||  || — || December 17, 2009 || Kitt Peak || Spacewatch || — || align=right | 3.0 km || 
|-id=811 bgcolor=#E9E9E9
| 432811 ||  || — || October 7, 2004 || Kitt Peak || Spacewatch || — || align=right | 1.8 km || 
|-id=812 bgcolor=#fefefe
| 432812 ||  || — || February 23, 2007 || Catalina || CSS || — || align=right | 1.3 km || 
|-id=813 bgcolor=#d6d6d6
| 432813 ||  || — || May 22, 2006 || Kitt Peak || Spacewatch || — || align=right | 2.6 km || 
|-id=814 bgcolor=#E9E9E9
| 432814 ||  || — || April 4, 2011 || Siding Spring || SSS || — || align=right | 2.0 km || 
|-id=815 bgcolor=#E9E9E9
| 432815 ||  || — || September 2, 2008 || Kitt Peak || Spacewatch || — || align=right | 1.2 km || 
|-id=816 bgcolor=#E9E9E9
| 432816 ||  || — || May 24, 2007 || Mount Lemmon || Mount Lemmon Survey || — || align=right data-sort-value="0.83" | 830 m || 
|-id=817 bgcolor=#E9E9E9
| 432817 ||  || — || April 5, 2011 || Kitt Peak || Spacewatch || GEF || align=right | 1.4 km || 
|-id=818 bgcolor=#E9E9E9
| 432818 ||  || — || September 25, 2008 || Kitt Peak || Spacewatch || — || align=right | 1.9 km || 
|-id=819 bgcolor=#E9E9E9
| 432819 ||  || — || September 26, 2008 || Kitt Peak || Spacewatch || — || align=right | 1.0 km || 
|-id=820 bgcolor=#E9E9E9
| 432820 ||  || — || April 25, 2007 || Kitt Peak || Spacewatch || — || align=right data-sort-value="0.78" | 780 m || 
|-id=821 bgcolor=#E9E9E9
| 432821 ||  || — || March 26, 2011 || Mount Lemmon || Mount Lemmon Survey || GEF || align=right | 1.1 km || 
|-id=822 bgcolor=#fefefe
| 432822 ||  || — || November 11, 2009 || Kitt Peak || Spacewatch || — || align=right data-sort-value="0.88" | 880 m || 
|-id=823 bgcolor=#fefefe
| 432823 ||  || — || March 2, 2011 || Kitt Peak || Spacewatch || SUL || align=right | 2.6 km || 
|-id=824 bgcolor=#E9E9E9
| 432824 ||  || — || January 31, 2006 || Mount Lemmon || Mount Lemmon Survey || — || align=right | 1.9 km || 
|-id=825 bgcolor=#E9E9E9
| 432825 ||  || — || March 27, 2011 || Kitt Peak || Spacewatch || — || align=right | 1.6 km || 
|-id=826 bgcolor=#E9E9E9
| 432826 ||  || — || January 28, 2011 || Mount Lemmon || Mount Lemmon Survey || — || align=right | 2.0 km || 
|-id=827 bgcolor=#d6d6d6
| 432827 ||  || — || September 3, 2007 || Catalina || CSS || EOS || align=right | 2.3 km || 
|-id=828 bgcolor=#E9E9E9
| 432828 ||  || — || September 5, 2008 || Kitt Peak || Spacewatch || EUN || align=right | 1.1 km || 
|-id=829 bgcolor=#E9E9E9
| 432829 ||  || — || September 5, 2008 || Kitt Peak || Spacewatch || — || align=right | 1.5 km || 
|-id=830 bgcolor=#E9E9E9
| 432830 ||  || — || April 24, 2011 || Mount Lemmon || Mount Lemmon Survey || — || align=right | 1.2 km || 
|-id=831 bgcolor=#E9E9E9
| 432831 ||  || — || January 7, 2010 || Mount Lemmon || Mount Lemmon Survey || — || align=right | 1.2 km || 
|-id=832 bgcolor=#E9E9E9
| 432832 ||  || — || March 10, 2011 || Mount Lemmon || Mount Lemmon Survey || EUN || align=right | 1.1 km || 
|-id=833 bgcolor=#E9E9E9
| 432833 ||  || — || January 8, 2006 || Mount Lemmon || Mount Lemmon Survey || EUN || align=right | 1.5 km || 
|-id=834 bgcolor=#E9E9E9
| 432834 ||  || — || October 7, 2008 || Mount Lemmon || Mount Lemmon Survey || — || align=right | 1.7 km || 
|-id=835 bgcolor=#d6d6d6
| 432835 ||  || — || December 18, 2003 || Socorro || LINEAR || — || align=right | 4.0 km || 
|-id=836 bgcolor=#E9E9E9
| 432836 ||  || — || February 8, 2010 || WISE || WISE || — || align=right | 2.3 km || 
|-id=837 bgcolor=#E9E9E9
| 432837 ||  || — || April 22, 2007 || Kitt Peak || Spacewatch || — || align=right | 1.1 km || 
|-id=838 bgcolor=#E9E9E9
| 432838 ||  || — || September 28, 2008 || Mount Lemmon || Mount Lemmon Survey || — || align=right | 1.3 km || 
|-id=839 bgcolor=#E9E9E9
| 432839 ||  || — || April 20, 2007 || Mount Lemmon || Mount Lemmon Survey || — || align=right | 1.2 km || 
|-id=840 bgcolor=#E9E9E9
| 432840 ||  || — || March 26, 2006 || Kitt Peak || Spacewatch || — || align=right | 2.0 km || 
|-id=841 bgcolor=#E9E9E9
| 432841 ||  || — || May 16, 2007 || Mount Lemmon || Mount Lemmon Survey || — || align=right | 1.0 km || 
|-id=842 bgcolor=#E9E9E9
| 432842 ||  || — || June 7, 2007 || Kitt Peak || Spacewatch || — || align=right | 1.4 km || 
|-id=843 bgcolor=#E9E9E9
| 432843 ||  || — || April 27, 2011 || Kitt Peak || Spacewatch || — || align=right | 1.7 km || 
|-id=844 bgcolor=#E9E9E9
| 432844 ||  || — || June 16, 2007 || Kitt Peak || Spacewatch || — || align=right | 2.2 km || 
|-id=845 bgcolor=#E9E9E9
| 432845 ||  || — || December 17, 2009 || Mount Lemmon || Mount Lemmon Survey || (5) || align=right data-sort-value="0.94" | 940 m || 
|-id=846 bgcolor=#E9E9E9
| 432846 ||  || — || April 25, 2007 || Mount Lemmon || Mount Lemmon Survey || — || align=right | 1.1 km || 
|-id=847 bgcolor=#E9E9E9
| 432847 ||  || — || April 23, 2011 || Kitt Peak || Spacewatch || — || align=right | 1.7 km || 
|-id=848 bgcolor=#E9E9E9
| 432848 ||  || — || October 13, 2007 || Mount Lemmon || Mount Lemmon Survey || — || align=right | 2.5 km || 
|-id=849 bgcolor=#E9E9E9
| 432849 ||  || — || April 25, 2007 || Kitt Peak || Spacewatch || — || align=right | 1.1 km || 
|-id=850 bgcolor=#E9E9E9
| 432850 ||  || — || November 23, 2009 || Kitt Peak || Spacewatch || EUN || align=right | 1.2 km || 
|-id=851 bgcolor=#E9E9E9
| 432851 ||  || — || January 30, 2006 || Kitt Peak || Spacewatch || — || align=right | 1.8 km || 
|-id=852 bgcolor=#E9E9E9
| 432852 ||  || — || November 1, 2008 || Mount Lemmon || Mount Lemmon Survey || MRX || align=right data-sort-value="0.96" | 960 m || 
|-id=853 bgcolor=#E9E9E9
| 432853 ||  || — || October 21, 1995 || Kitt Peak || Spacewatch || — || align=right | 1.5 km || 
|-id=854 bgcolor=#d6d6d6
| 432854 ||  || — || January 16, 2004 || Catalina || CSS || — || align=right | 4.3 km || 
|-id=855 bgcolor=#d6d6d6
| 432855 ||  || — || April 28, 2011 || Kitt Peak || Spacewatch || — || align=right | 2.9 km || 
|-id=856 bgcolor=#E9E9E9
| 432856 ||  || — || January 10, 2006 || Mount Lemmon || Mount Lemmon Survey || — || align=right | 1.1 km || 
|-id=857 bgcolor=#E9E9E9
| 432857 ||  || — || April 24, 2011 || Kitt Peak || Spacewatch || — || align=right | 1.7 km || 
|-id=858 bgcolor=#E9E9E9
| 432858 ||  || — || February 25, 2006 || Mount Lemmon || Mount Lemmon Survey || — || align=right | 1.7 km || 
|-id=859 bgcolor=#E9E9E9
| 432859 ||  || — || October 21, 1995 || Kitt Peak || Spacewatch || — || align=right | 1.5 km || 
|-id=860 bgcolor=#E9E9E9
| 432860 ||  || — || September 15, 2007 || Mount Lemmon || Mount Lemmon Survey || — || align=right | 1.8 km || 
|-id=861 bgcolor=#E9E9E9
| 432861 ||  || — || January 28, 2006 || Kitt Peak || Spacewatch || — || align=right | 2.2 km || 
|-id=862 bgcolor=#E9E9E9
| 432862 ||  || — || November 4, 2004 || Kitt Peak || Spacewatch || — || align=right | 1.5 km || 
|-id=863 bgcolor=#E9E9E9
| 432863 ||  || — || May 11, 2007 || Mount Lemmon || Mount Lemmon Survey || — || align=right | 1.7 km || 
|-id=864 bgcolor=#d6d6d6
| 432864 ||  || — || May 25, 2006 || Kitt Peak || Spacewatch || — || align=right | 2.1 km || 
|-id=865 bgcolor=#E9E9E9
| 432865 ||  || — || October 12, 2009 || Mount Lemmon || Mount Lemmon Survey || EUN || align=right | 1.1 km || 
|-id=866 bgcolor=#E9E9E9
| 432866 ||  || — || January 25, 2006 || Kitt Peak || Spacewatch || — || align=right | 1.5 km || 
|-id=867 bgcolor=#E9E9E9
| 432867 ||  || — || March 15, 2007 || Kitt Peak || Spacewatch || — || align=right | 1.2 km || 
|-id=868 bgcolor=#E9E9E9
| 432868 ||  || — || September 7, 2008 || Mount Lemmon || Mount Lemmon Survey || — || align=right data-sort-value="0.91" | 910 m || 
|-id=869 bgcolor=#E9E9E9
| 432869 ||  || — || April 2, 2011 || Kitt Peak || Spacewatch || — || align=right | 1.7 km || 
|-id=870 bgcolor=#E9E9E9
| 432870 ||  || — || April 24, 2011 || Kitt Peak || Spacewatch || — || align=right | 1.8 km || 
|-id=871 bgcolor=#E9E9E9
| 432871 ||  || — || February 27, 2006 || Catalina || CSS || — || align=right | 2.1 km || 
|-id=872 bgcolor=#E9E9E9
| 432872 ||  || — || January 28, 2006 || Kitt Peak || Spacewatch || — || align=right | 1.4 km || 
|-id=873 bgcolor=#d6d6d6
| 432873 ||  || — || April 28, 2011 || Kitt Peak || Spacewatch || — || align=right | 3.1 km || 
|-id=874 bgcolor=#E9E9E9
| 432874 ||  || — || March 8, 2010 || WISE || WISE || ADE || align=right | 1.9 km || 
|-id=875 bgcolor=#E9E9E9
| 432875 ||  || — || June 9, 2007 || Kitt Peak || Spacewatch || — || align=right | 1.3 km || 
|-id=876 bgcolor=#d6d6d6
| 432876 ||  || — || January 1, 2009 || Kitt Peak || Spacewatch || — || align=right | 3.6 km || 
|-id=877 bgcolor=#E9E9E9
| 432877 ||  || — || April 5, 2011 || Mount Lemmon || Mount Lemmon Survey || — || align=right | 1.1 km || 
|-id=878 bgcolor=#d6d6d6
| 432878 ||  || — || November 1, 2008 || Mount Lemmon || Mount Lemmon Survey || — || align=right | 2.9 km || 
|-id=879 bgcolor=#E9E9E9
| 432879 ||  || — || September 4, 2008 || Kitt Peak || Spacewatch || — || align=right | 1.3 km || 
|-id=880 bgcolor=#E9E9E9
| 432880 ||  || — || October 28, 2008 || Kitt Peak || Spacewatch || EUN || align=right | 1.1 km || 
|-id=881 bgcolor=#E9E9E9
| 432881 ||  || — || April 5, 2011 || Mount Lemmon || Mount Lemmon Survey || — || align=right data-sort-value="0.98" | 980 m || 
|-id=882 bgcolor=#E9E9E9
| 432882 ||  || — || January 31, 2006 || Mount Lemmon || Mount Lemmon Survey || — || align=right | 2.1 km || 
|-id=883 bgcolor=#d6d6d6
| 432883 ||  || — || November 7, 2007 || Catalina || CSS || — || align=right | 4.3 km || 
|-id=884 bgcolor=#E9E9E9
| 432884 ||  || — || August 8, 2007 || Socorro || LINEAR || — || align=right | 2.2 km || 
|-id=885 bgcolor=#E9E9E9
| 432885 ||  || — || February 16, 2010 || Mount Lemmon || Mount Lemmon Survey || AGN || align=right | 1.0 km || 
|-id=886 bgcolor=#d6d6d6
| 432886 ||  || — || March 20, 2010 || Kitt Peak || Spacewatch || — || align=right | 3.4 km || 
|-id=887 bgcolor=#E9E9E9
| 432887 ||  || — || March 23, 2006 || Catalina || CSS || — || align=right | 3.3 km || 
|-id=888 bgcolor=#E9E9E9
| 432888 ||  || — || September 30, 2003 || Kitt Peak || Spacewatch || AGN || align=right | 1.2 km || 
|-id=889 bgcolor=#E9E9E9
| 432889 ||  || — || April 14, 1997 || Kitt Peak || Spacewatch || — || align=right | 3.1 km || 
|-id=890 bgcolor=#E9E9E9
| 432890 ||  || — || January 4, 2006 || Kitt Peak || Spacewatch || (5) || align=right data-sort-value="0.98" | 980 m || 
|-id=891 bgcolor=#E9E9E9
| 432891 ||  || — || February 4, 2006 || Kitt Peak || Spacewatch || — || align=right | 1.4 km || 
|-id=892 bgcolor=#d6d6d6
| 432892 ||  || — || June 27, 2011 || Kitt Peak || Spacewatch || — || align=right | 3.2 km || 
|-id=893 bgcolor=#E9E9E9
| 432893 ||  || — || January 30, 2011 || Mount Lemmon || Mount Lemmon Survey || — || align=right | 1.2 km || 
|-id=894 bgcolor=#d6d6d6
| 432894 ||  || — || July 3, 2005 || Mount Lemmon || Mount Lemmon Survey || — || align=right | 3.1 km || 
|-id=895 bgcolor=#E9E9E9
| 432895 ||  || — || May 9, 2006 || Mount Lemmon || Mount Lemmon Survey || DOR || align=right | 2.5 km || 
|-id=896 bgcolor=#d6d6d6
| 432896 ||  || — || February 3, 2009 || Mount Lemmon || Mount Lemmon Survey || — || align=right | 4.2 km || 
|-id=897 bgcolor=#E9E9E9
| 432897 ||  || — || January 27, 2006 || Mount Lemmon || Mount Lemmon Survey || — || align=right | 1.7 km || 
|-id=898 bgcolor=#E9E9E9
| 432898 ||  || — || February 1, 2006 || Mount Lemmon || Mount Lemmon Survey || — || align=right | 1.7 km || 
|-id=899 bgcolor=#E9E9E9
| 432899 ||  || — || July 23, 2011 || Siding Spring || SSS || — || align=right | 2.6 km || 
|-id=900 bgcolor=#d6d6d6
| 432900 ||  || — || May 29, 2010 || WISE || WISE || — || align=right | 2.6 km || 
|}

432901–433000 

|-bgcolor=#d6d6d6
| 432901 ||  || — || December 29, 2008 || Kitt Peak || Spacewatch || — || align=right | 2.5 km || 
|-id=902 bgcolor=#d6d6d6
| 432902 ||  || — || June 11, 2011 || Mount Lemmon || Mount Lemmon Survey || — || align=right | 3.3 km || 
|-id=903 bgcolor=#d6d6d6
| 432903 ||  || — || February 3, 2009 || Kitt Peak || Spacewatch || — || align=right | 2.8 km || 
|-id=904 bgcolor=#d6d6d6
| 432904 ||  || — || May 30, 2000 || Kitt Peak || Spacewatch || — || align=right | 2.3 km || 
|-id=905 bgcolor=#d6d6d6
| 432905 ||  || — || October 3, 2006 || Mount Lemmon || Mount Lemmon Survey || — || align=right | 2.7 km || 
|-id=906 bgcolor=#d6d6d6
| 432906 ||  || — || April 10, 2010 || Kitt Peak || Spacewatch || LIX || align=right | 3.0 km || 
|-id=907 bgcolor=#E9E9E9
| 432907 ||  || — || March 23, 2006 || Kitt Peak || Spacewatch || — || align=right | 1.5 km || 
|-id=908 bgcolor=#E9E9E9
| 432908 ||  || — || March 4, 2005 || Mount Lemmon || Mount Lemmon Survey || DOR || align=right | 2.6 km || 
|-id=909 bgcolor=#d6d6d6
| 432909 ||  || — || April 15, 2010 || Kitt Peak || Spacewatch || LIX || align=right | 4.4 km || 
|-id=910 bgcolor=#d6d6d6
| 432910 ||  || — || December 30, 2007 || Kitt Peak || Spacewatch || — || align=right | 3.9 km || 
|-id=911 bgcolor=#d6d6d6
| 432911 ||  || — || August 4, 2010 || WISE || WISE || — || align=right | 4.3 km || 
|-id=912 bgcolor=#d6d6d6
| 432912 ||  || — || January 19, 2010 || WISE || WISE || — || align=right | 2.9 km || 
|-id=913 bgcolor=#d6d6d6
| 432913 ||  || — || April 10, 2010 || Kitt Peak || Spacewatch || — || align=right | 3.7 km || 
|-id=914 bgcolor=#d6d6d6
| 432914 ||  || — || December 6, 1996 || Kitt Peak || Spacewatch || 3:2 || align=right | 4.1 km || 
|-id=915 bgcolor=#d6d6d6
| 432915 ||  || — || September 30, 2000 || Socorro || LINEAR || — || align=right | 4.2 km || 
|-id=916 bgcolor=#d6d6d6
| 432916 ||  || — || March 11, 2008 || Kitt Peak || Spacewatch || 3:2 || align=right | 3.5 km || 
|-id=917 bgcolor=#d6d6d6
| 432917 ||  || — || December 22, 2008 || Mount Lemmon || Mount Lemmon Survey || — || align=right | 4.1 km || 
|-id=918 bgcolor=#d6d6d6
| 432918 ||  || — || September 30, 2006 || Mount Lemmon || Mount Lemmon Survey || — || align=right | 3.4 km || 
|-id=919 bgcolor=#d6d6d6
| 432919 ||  || — || March 2, 2010 || WISE || WISE || — || align=right | 5.0 km || 
|-id=920 bgcolor=#d6d6d6
| 432920 ||  || — || August 21, 2000 || Anderson Mesa || LONEOS || — || align=right | 3.3 km || 
|-id=921 bgcolor=#d6d6d6
| 432921 ||  || — || August 29, 2011 || Siding Spring || SSS || 3:2 || align=right | 5.5 km || 
|-id=922 bgcolor=#d6d6d6
| 432922 ||  || — || October 29, 2000 || Kitt Peak || Spacewatch || — || align=right | 3.3 km || 
|-id=923 bgcolor=#d6d6d6
| 432923 ||  || — || April 2, 2009 || Kitt Peak || Spacewatch || — || align=right | 3.1 km || 
|-id=924 bgcolor=#fefefe
| 432924 ||  || — || April 2, 2005 || Mount Lemmon || Mount Lemmon Survey || H || align=right data-sort-value="0.67" | 670 m || 
|-id=925 bgcolor=#d6d6d6
| 432925 ||  || — || March 29, 2009 || Kitt Peak || Spacewatch || — || align=right | 3.6 km || 
|-id=926 bgcolor=#d6d6d6
| 432926 ||  || — || January 28, 2010 || WISE || WISE || — || align=right | 3.2 km || 
|-id=927 bgcolor=#d6d6d6
| 432927 ||  || — || November 17, 1995 || Kitt Peak || Spacewatch || — || align=right | 3.2 km || 
|-id=928 bgcolor=#d6d6d6
| 432928 ||  || — || July 4, 2005 || Mount Lemmon || Mount Lemmon Survey || — || align=right | 3.0 km || 
|-id=929 bgcolor=#d6d6d6
| 432929 ||  || — || July 5, 2005 || Kitt Peak || Spacewatch || THM || align=right | 2.2 km || 
|-id=930 bgcolor=#d6d6d6
| 432930 ||  || — || May 10, 2004 || Kitt Peak || Spacewatch || — || align=right | 3.4 km || 
|-id=931 bgcolor=#d6d6d6
| 432931 ||  || — || May 9, 2010 || WISE || WISE || 3:2 || align=right | 4.6 km || 
|-id=932 bgcolor=#fefefe
| 432932 ||  || — || December 17, 2003 || Socorro || LINEAR || H || align=right | 1.0 km || 
|-id=933 bgcolor=#d6d6d6
| 432933 ||  || — || February 2, 2009 || Mount Lemmon || Mount Lemmon Survey || — || align=right | 3.5 km || 
|-id=934 bgcolor=#d6d6d6
| 432934 ||  || — || March 29, 2009 || Kitt Peak || Spacewatch || — || align=right | 3.1 km || 
|-id=935 bgcolor=#d6d6d6
| 432935 ||  || — || September 24, 2000 || Socorro || LINEAR || — || align=right | 3.8 km || 
|-id=936 bgcolor=#d6d6d6
| 432936 ||  || — || November 16, 2000 || Kitt Peak || Spacewatch || — || align=right | 3.1 km || 
|-id=937 bgcolor=#d6d6d6
| 432937 ||  || — || April 9, 2003 || Kitt Peak || Spacewatch || 7:4 || align=right | 4.2 km || 
|-id=938 bgcolor=#fefefe
| 432938 ||  || — || September 23, 2008 || Catalina || CSS || H || align=right data-sort-value="0.83" | 830 m || 
|-id=939 bgcolor=#fefefe
| 432939 ||  || — || March 13, 2005 || Mount Lemmon || Mount Lemmon Survey || H || align=right data-sort-value="0.73" | 730 m || 
|-id=940 bgcolor=#fefefe
| 432940 ||  || — || August 30, 2005 || Campo Imperatore || CINEOS || H || align=right data-sort-value="0.66" | 660 m || 
|-id=941 bgcolor=#fefefe
| 432941 ||  || — || November 6, 2005 || Catalina || CSS || H || align=right | 1.1 km || 
|-id=942 bgcolor=#fefefe
| 432942 ||  || — || November 3, 2007 || Kitt Peak || Spacewatch || — || align=right data-sort-value="0.59" | 590 m || 
|-id=943 bgcolor=#fefefe
| 432943 ||  || — || May 21, 2010 || Mount Lemmon || Mount Lemmon Survey || H || align=right data-sort-value="0.89" | 890 m || 
|-id=944 bgcolor=#fefefe
| 432944 ||  || — || March 15, 2007 || Mount Lemmon || Mount Lemmon Survey || H || align=right data-sort-value="0.93" | 930 m || 
|-id=945 bgcolor=#fefefe
| 432945 ||  || — || November 20, 2006 || Kitt Peak || Spacewatch || — || align=right | 1.2 km || 
|-id=946 bgcolor=#fefefe
| 432946 ||  || — || February 25, 2012 || Kitt Peak || Spacewatch || — || align=right data-sort-value="0.73" | 730 m || 
|-id=947 bgcolor=#fefefe
| 432947 ||  || — || September 16, 2003 || Kitt Peak || Spacewatch || — || align=right data-sort-value="0.65" | 650 m || 
|-id=948 bgcolor=#fefefe
| 432948 ||  || — || April 29, 2009 || Kitt Peak || Spacewatch || — || align=right data-sort-value="0.52" | 520 m || 
|-id=949 bgcolor=#C2E0FF
| 432949 ||  || — || April 19, 2012 || Charleston || T. Vorobjov || res4:5 || align=right | 235 km || 
|-id=950 bgcolor=#fefefe
| 432950 ||  || — || October 20, 2007 || Mount Lemmon || Mount Lemmon Survey || — || align=right data-sort-value="0.59" | 590 m || 
|-id=951 bgcolor=#fefefe
| 432951 ||  || — || December 2, 2010 || Mount Lemmon || Mount Lemmon Survey || critical || align=right data-sort-value="0.82" | 820 m || 
|-id=952 bgcolor=#fefefe
| 432952 ||  || — || September 26, 2006 || Catalina || CSS || — || align=right data-sort-value="0.87" | 870 m || 
|-id=953 bgcolor=#fefefe
| 432953 ||  || — || March 26, 2008 || Kitt Peak || Spacewatch || — || align=right data-sort-value="0.65" | 650 m || 
|-id=954 bgcolor=#fefefe
| 432954 ||  || — || September 14, 2006 || Catalina || CSS || — || align=right data-sort-value="0.74" | 740 m || 
|-id=955 bgcolor=#fefefe
| 432955 ||  || — || April 20, 2012 || Mount Lemmon || Mount Lemmon Survey || — || align=right data-sort-value="0.87" | 870 m || 
|-id=956 bgcolor=#fefefe
| 432956 ||  || — || July 31, 2009 || Kitt Peak || Spacewatch || — || align=right data-sort-value="0.65" | 650 m || 
|-id=957 bgcolor=#fefefe
| 432957 ||  || — || April 19, 2012 || Kitt Peak || Spacewatch || V || align=right data-sort-value="0.54" | 540 m || 
|-id=958 bgcolor=#fefefe
| 432958 ||  || — || October 22, 2006 || Catalina || CSS || BAP || align=right data-sort-value="0.99" | 990 m || 
|-id=959 bgcolor=#fefefe
| 432959 ||  || — || March 2, 2008 || Mount Lemmon || Mount Lemmon Survey || V || align=right data-sort-value="0.78" | 780 m || 
|-id=960 bgcolor=#fefefe
| 432960 ||  || — || March 28, 2012 || Mount Lemmon || Mount Lemmon Survey || critical || align=right data-sort-value="0.65" | 650 m || 
|-id=961 bgcolor=#fefefe
| 432961 ||  || — || November 19, 1992 || Kitt Peak || Spacewatch || — || align=right | 1.0 km || 
|-id=962 bgcolor=#fefefe
| 432962 ||  || — || October 1, 2009 || Mount Lemmon || Mount Lemmon Survey || — || align=right data-sort-value="0.84" | 840 m || 
|-id=963 bgcolor=#fefefe
| 432963 ||  || — || October 21, 2006 || Mount Lemmon || Mount Lemmon Survey || — || align=right data-sort-value="0.73" | 730 m || 
|-id=964 bgcolor=#fefefe
| 432964 ||  || — || April 21, 2012 || Mount Lemmon || Mount Lemmon Survey || — || align=right data-sort-value="0.76" | 760 m || 
|-id=965 bgcolor=#E9E9E9
| 432965 ||  || — || October 9, 2005 || Kitt Peak || Spacewatch || — || align=right | 1.5 km || 
|-id=966 bgcolor=#fefefe
| 432966 ||  || — || October 4, 1999 || Socorro || LINEAR || — || align=right data-sort-value="0.86" | 860 m || 
|-id=967 bgcolor=#fefefe
| 432967 ||  || — || April 15, 2012 || Catalina || CSS || — || align=right data-sort-value="0.68" | 680 m || 
|-id=968 bgcolor=#fefefe
| 432968 ||  || — || April 30, 2005 || Kitt Peak || Spacewatch || — || align=right data-sort-value="0.66" | 660 m || 
|-id=969 bgcolor=#fefefe
| 432969 ||  || — || May 20, 2012 || Mount Lemmon || Mount Lemmon Survey || — || align=right data-sort-value="0.86" | 860 m || 
|-id=970 bgcolor=#fefefe
| 432970 ||  || — || March 29, 2008 || Mount Lemmon || Mount Lemmon Survey || — || align=right data-sort-value="0.74" | 740 m || 
|-id=971 bgcolor=#E9E9E9
| 432971 Loving ||  ||  || February 11, 2010 || WISE || WISE || — || align=right | 1.1 km || 
|-id=972 bgcolor=#E9E9E9
| 432972 ||  || — || March 13, 2007 || Mount Lemmon || Mount Lemmon Survey || — || align=right | 1.3 km || 
|-id=973 bgcolor=#fefefe
| 432973 ||  || — || May 19, 2012 || Mount Lemmon || Mount Lemmon Survey || — || align=right data-sort-value="0.72" | 720 m || 
|-id=974 bgcolor=#fefefe
| 432974 ||  || — || April 29, 2008 || Mount Lemmon || Mount Lemmon Survey || — || align=right data-sort-value="0.93" | 930 m || 
|-id=975 bgcolor=#fefefe
| 432975 ||  || — || November 9, 1996 || Kitt Peak || Spacewatch || — || align=right data-sort-value="0.77" | 770 m || 
|-id=976 bgcolor=#fefefe
| 432976 ||  || — || February 28, 2008 || Mount Lemmon || Mount Lemmon Survey || (2076) || align=right data-sort-value="0.71" | 710 m || 
|-id=977 bgcolor=#fefefe
| 432977 ||  || — || January 7, 2010 || Mount Lemmon || Mount Lemmon Survey || — || align=right | 1.5 km || 
|-id=978 bgcolor=#E9E9E9
| 432978 ||  || — || June 12, 2004 || Socorro || LINEAR || — || align=right | 1.6 km || 
|-id=979 bgcolor=#E9E9E9
| 432979 ||  || — || October 24, 2008 || Kitt Peak || Spacewatch || HOF || align=right | 2.4 km || 
|-id=980 bgcolor=#E9E9E9
| 432980 ||  || — || October 31, 2008 || Kitt Peak || Spacewatch || — || align=right | 1.8 km || 
|-id=981 bgcolor=#E9E9E9
| 432981 ||  || — || May 25, 2011 || Mount Lemmon || Mount Lemmon Survey || — || align=right | 1.9 km || 
|-id=982 bgcolor=#d6d6d6
| 432982 ||  || — || August 10, 2012 || Kitt Peak || Spacewatch || — || align=right | 3.3 km || 
|-id=983 bgcolor=#E9E9E9
| 432983 ||  || — || August 10, 2012 || Kitt Peak || Spacewatch || — || align=right | 1.9 km || 
|-id=984 bgcolor=#E9E9E9
| 432984 ||  || — || June 16, 2007 || Kitt Peak || Spacewatch || — || align=right | 2.1 km || 
|-id=985 bgcolor=#E9E9E9
| 432985 ||  || — || September 29, 2008 || Kitt Peak || Spacewatch || — || align=right | 1.4 km || 
|-id=986 bgcolor=#d6d6d6
| 432986 ||  || — || October 10, 2007 || Kitt Peak || Spacewatch || — || align=right | 3.1 km || 
|-id=987 bgcolor=#fefefe
| 432987 ||  || — || December 21, 2005 || Kitt Peak || Spacewatch || — || align=right data-sort-value="0.79" | 790 m || 
|-id=988 bgcolor=#E9E9E9
| 432988 ||  || — || September 29, 2003 || Kitt Peak || Spacewatch || — || align=right | 1.8 km || 
|-id=989 bgcolor=#E9E9E9
| 432989 ||  || — || September 23, 2008 || Catalina || CSS || — || align=right | 2.5 km || 
|-id=990 bgcolor=#E9E9E9
| 432990 ||  || — || November 17, 2009 || Mount Lemmon || Mount Lemmon Survey || EUN || align=right | 1.3 km || 
|-id=991 bgcolor=#d6d6d6
| 432991 ||  || — || August 13, 2007 || XuYi || PMO NEO || — || align=right | 4.2 km || 
|-id=992 bgcolor=#fefefe
| 432992 ||  || — || April 30, 2004 || Kitt Peak || Spacewatch || — || align=right | 1.0 km || 
|-id=993 bgcolor=#d6d6d6
| 432993 ||  || — || October 8, 2007 || Catalina || CSS || — || align=right | 2.9 km || 
|-id=994 bgcolor=#d6d6d6
| 432994 ||  || — || October 25, 2008 || Kitt Peak || Spacewatch || — || align=right | 2.1 km || 
|-id=995 bgcolor=#E9E9E9
| 432995 ||  || — || September 29, 2003 || Kitt Peak || Spacewatch || WIT || align=right | 1.0 km || 
|-id=996 bgcolor=#E9E9E9
| 432996 ||  || — || April 13, 2011 || Mount Lemmon || Mount Lemmon Survey || — || align=right | 1.6 km || 
|-id=997 bgcolor=#d6d6d6
| 432997 ||  || — || September 19, 2007 || Kitt Peak || Spacewatch || — || align=right | 2.0 km || 
|-id=998 bgcolor=#E9E9E9
| 432998 ||  || — || June 26, 1995 || Kitt Peak || Spacewatch || EUN || align=right | 1.3 km || 
|-id=999 bgcolor=#d6d6d6
| 432999 ||  || — || September 15, 2007 || Kitt Peak || Spacewatch || — || align=right | 2.2 km || 
|-id=000 bgcolor=#d6d6d6
| 433000 ||  || — || August 24, 2012 || Kitt Peak || Spacewatch || — || align=right | 2.2 km || 
|}

References

External links 
 Discovery Circumstances: Numbered Minor Planets (430001)–(435000) (IAU Minor Planet Center)

0432